= Hanabila Mosque =

Mosque in Damascus, Syria

- جامع الحنابلة
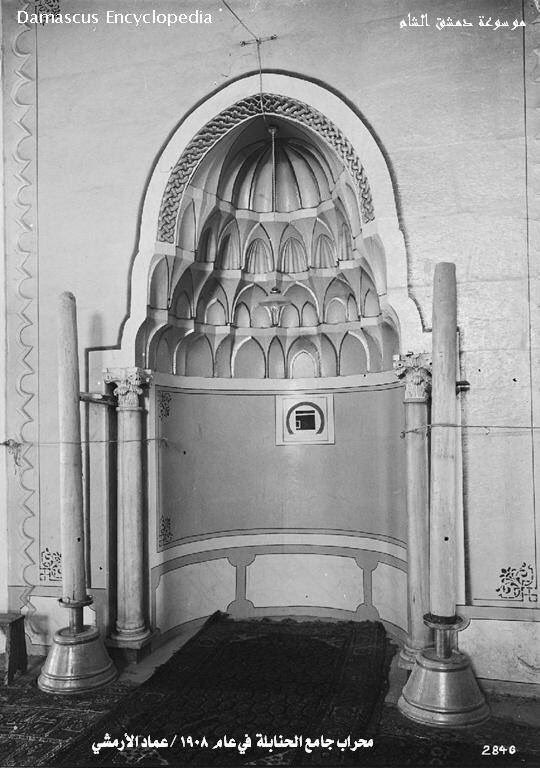
- Mosque's mihrab (1908)

- Location of the mosque in Damascus

Religion
- Affiliation: Islam
- Ecclesiastical or organisational status: Mosque
- Status: Active

Location
- Location: Al-Salihiyah, Damascus
- Country: Syria
- Interactive map of Hanabila Mosque
- Coordinates: 33°31′53″N 36°17′22″E

Architecture
- Type: Islamic architecture
- Style: Ayyubid
- Founder: Abu Umar Muhammad bin Qudama al-Muqaddasi
- Completed: 604 AH (1207/1208 CE)

Specifications
- Minaret: 1
- Materials: Stone, tiles, timber

The Hanabila Mosque (Arabic: جامع الحنابلة, romanized: Jami' al-Hanabila), also called the Muzaffari Mosque, is an early Ayyubid-era mosque in Damascus, Syria. The mosque was in use by 604 AH (1207/1208 CE); with the minaret completed in 606 AH (1209/1210 CE). The mosque was founded by Abu Umar Muhammad bin Qudama al-Muqaddasi, and funded with the assistance of al-Malik al-Muzaffar Gokburi. The minbar dates to 604 AH (1207 CE), and it was designed by Ibrahim al-Kurdi.

The design of the mosque is believed to be a miniature version of the Umayyad Mosque. The mosque features a gable roof, an architectural characteristic of the Umayyad Mosque that was subsequently adopted in a number of later Ayyubid mosques and structures, including those of Bab Musalla, Jarrah, Al-Jisr Al-Abyad, Al-Jadid, and Al-Tawba.

== See also ==
- List of mosques in Damascus
- Islam in Syria
