= Al-Shamiyah al-Kubra Madrasa =

- المدرسة الشامية الكبرى

Location
- Souk Sarouja; Damascus; Syria; 33.51513788°N 36.29976977°E

Information
- Type: madrasa
- Established: 1190
- Founder: Sitt al-Sham
- Campus: Urban
- Affiliation: Islamic

Al-Shamiyah al-Kubra Madrasa or al-Mu'azzamiyya Madrasa (Arabic: المدرسة الشامية الكبرى) is a 12th-century madrasa complex located in Damascus, Syria.

== See also ==
- Al-Adiliyah Madrasa
- Al-Rukniyah Madrasa
- Az-Zahiriyah Library
- Nur al-Din Madrasa
