= Al-Sibaiyah Madrasa =

- الْمَدْرَسَة السيبائية
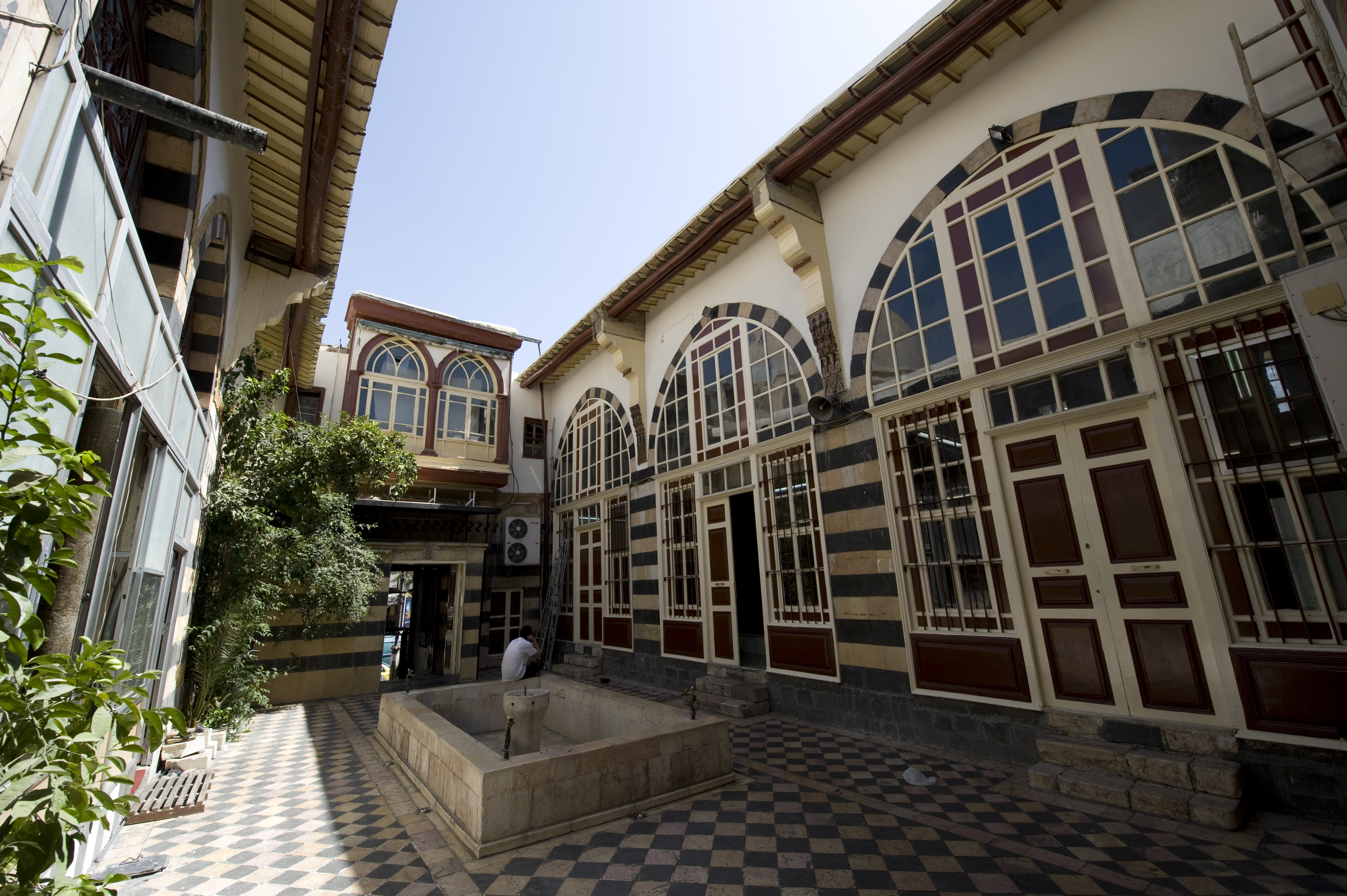

Location
- Al-Darwishiyah Street, Bab al-Jabiya district Damascus; Syria

Information
- Type: madrasa
- Established: 1515
- Founder: Prince Sibai
- Campus: Urban
- Affiliation: Islamic

Al-Sibaiyah Madrasa or Jami al-Jawami (Arabic: المدرسة السيبائية, romanized: al-Madrasah as-Sibāʿīyah) is a 16th-century madrasa complex in Damascus, Syria.

== Gallery ==
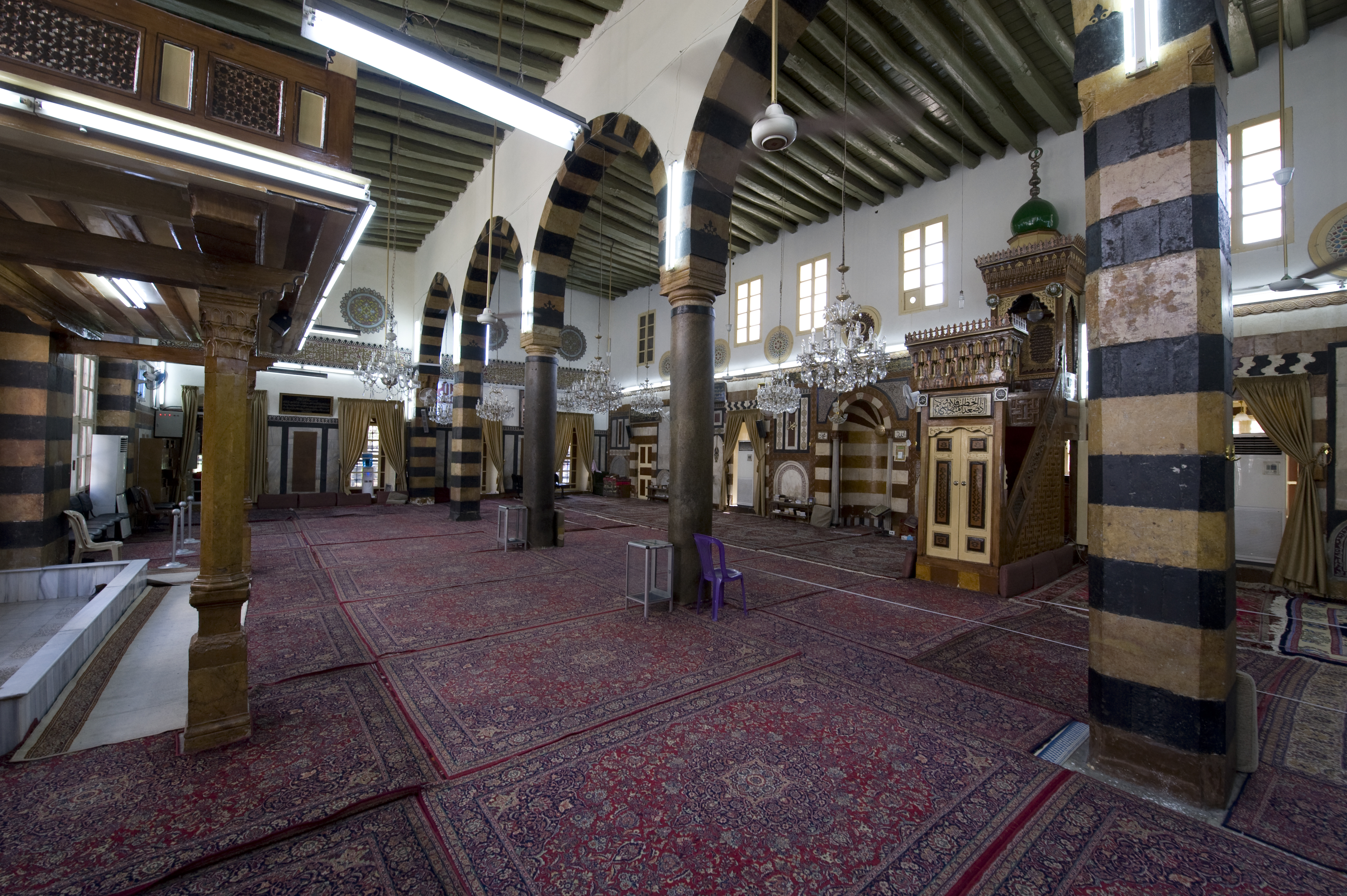
inside the mosque

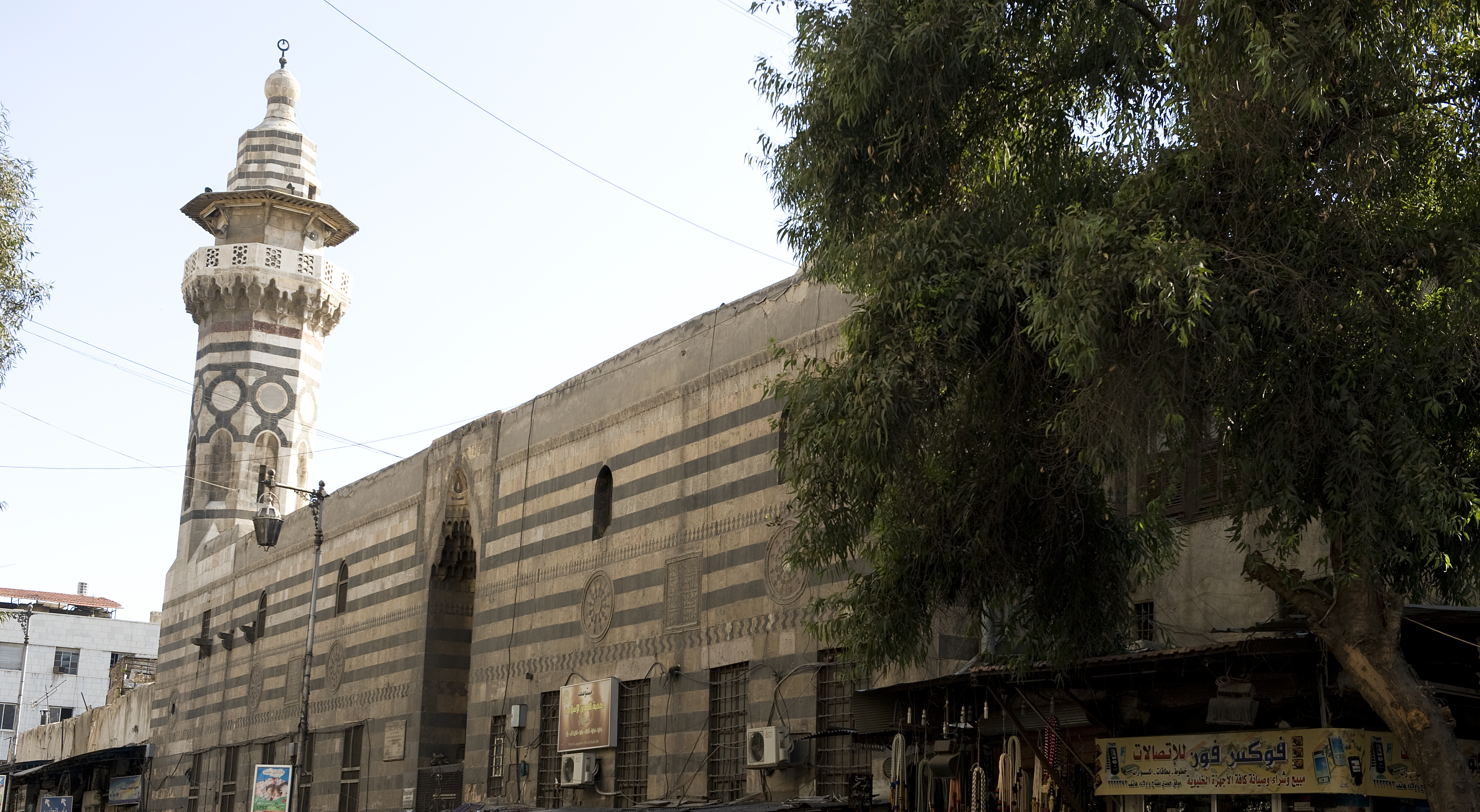
Facade of the mosque and madrasa

== See also ==
- Al-Adiliyah Madrasa
- Al-Rukniyah Madrasa
- Az-Zahiriyah Library
- Nur al-Din Madrasa
