= List of mosques in Damascus =

Damascus is home to many mosques, each drawing from various periods of its history such as the Umayyad Caliphate (of which Damascus was the seat), and during the Abbasid Caliphate (Zengid, Ayyubid, and Mamluk), Fatimid and Ottoman periods and finally the modern Syrian Arab Republic.

== List of mosques ==
Name	Images	Year (CE)	Period	Neighborhood	Remarks
Umayyad Mosque		715	Umayyad	Old City	The largest in Damascus and considered to be the national mosque of Syria
Fulus Mosque		11th century	Fatimid	Al-Midan	
Nur al-Din Madrasa and Mosque		1167	Zengid	Old City	Originally a madrasa with a later mausoleum
Farrukh Shah Madrasa and Mosque		1183	Ayyubid	Muhajreen	Originally a madrasa with a later mausoleum
Al-Shamiyah Madrasa and Mosque		1190	Ayyubid	Sarouja	Originally a madrasa
Hanabila Mosque		1208	Ayyubid	Al-Salihiyah	The first congregational mosque outside the old city walls
Bab Musalla Mosque		1210	Ayyubid	Al-Shaghour	
Al-Jisr Al-Abyad Mosque		1214	Ayyubid	Al-Salihiyah	
Al-Rukniya Madrasa and Mosque		1224	Ayyubid	Rukn ad-Din	
Jarrah Mosque		1233	Ayyubid	Al-Shaghour	
Aqsab Mosque (Al-Sadat Mosque)		1234	Ayyubid	Sarouja	
Al-Tawba Mosque		1235	Ayyubid	Sarouja	Nicknamed "the Small Umayyad Mosque" because of its resemblance to Damascus's Umayyad Mosque
Al-Atabikiyya Madrasa and Mosque		1242	Ayyubid	Al-Salihiyah	
Al-Jadid Mosque		1255	Ayyubid	Al-Salihiyah	
Al-Murshidiyya Madrasa and Mosque		1256	Ayyubid	Al-Salihiyah	
Al-Badra'iyya Mosque		1256	Ayyubid	Old City	
Yalbugha Mosque		1264	Mamluk	Sarouja	Repurposed for profane use in the 19th century; demolished in 1974; rebuilt on the same location in 2014
Al-Afram Mosque		1307	Mamluk	Muhajreen	Renovated in 1956
Al-Daqqaq Mosque (Al-Karimi Mosque)		1318	Mamluk	Al-Midan	
Tankiz Mosque		1318	Mamluk	Qanawat	Rebuilt in 1951
Al-Jawza Mosque		1330	Mamluk	Al-Amara	
Al-Sanjaqdar Mosque		1348	Mamluk	Qanawat	
Al-Ajami Mosque		1348	Mamluk	Al-Shaghour	
Manjak Mosque		1370	Mamluk	Al-Midan	
Al-Tawusiyya Mosque		1382	Mamluk	Sarouja	
Al-Taynabiyya Mosque		1394	Mamluk	Al-Midan	
Al-Thaqafi Mosque (Al-Saqifa Mosque)		1412	Mamluk	Al-Qassaa	outside of Bab Tuma.
Al-Tawrizi Mosque (Al-Teirouzi Mosque)		1422	Mamluk	Qanawat	
Al-Ward Mosque		1426	Mamluk	Sarouja	
Sidi Hisham ibn Ammar Mosque		1427	Mamluk	Old City	
Al-Qal'i (Al-Qalai) Mosque		1431	Mamluk	Old City	
Al-Shadhbakiya Madrasa and Mosque		1453	Mamluk	Qanawat	
Al-Khanqah Al-Nuhasiyya Mosque		1458	Mamluk	Sarouja	
Al-Muallaq Mosque		1458	Mamluk	Sarouja	
Al-Sabuniyya Madrasa and Mosque		1464	Mamluk	Al-Shaghour	
Qutb Al-Din Al-Khudairi Mosque		1473	Mamluk	Old City	
Al-Hiwatiyya Mosque		1481	Mamluk	Al-Shaghour	
Al-Sibaiyah Madrasa and Mosque		1515	Mamluk	Qanawat	
Ibn Arabi Mosque (Salimiyya Takiyya)		1519	Ottoman	Al-Salihiyah	A Mosque and a takiyya (Note: An institution established to serve pilgrims and the poor, providing communal meals through a soup kitchen as well as residential accommodation.)
Sulaymaniyya Takiyya		1559	Ottoman	Qanawat	A Mosque and a takiyya (Note: An institution established to serve pilgrims and the poor, providing communal meals through a soup kitchen as well as residential accommodation.)
Al-Naqshabandi Mosque		1568	Ottoman	Al-Shaghour	Also known as the Murad Pasha Mosque after the commissioner of the mosque.
Darwish Pasha Mosque		1574	Ottoman	Qanawat	
Al-Yaghushiyya Mosque		1587	Ottoman	Old City	
Sinan Pasha Mosque		1590	Ottoman	Old City	Named after Sinan Pasha
Al-Safarjalani Mosque (Al-Qari Mosque)		1699	Ottoman	Old City	
Abd al-Ghani al-Nabulsi Mosque		1733	Ottoman	Al-Salihiyah	
Al-Fathiyah Madrasa and Mosque		1743	Ottoman	Old City	
Al-Iman Mosque		1970	Modern	Al-Salihiyah	
Sayyidah Ruqayya Mosque		1985	Modern	Old City	Twelver Shiʿa shrine dedicated to Ruqayya Twelver Shiʿa shrine dedicated to Ruqayya (according to Twelver Shi'ism)

== See also ==
- Islam in Syria
- List of mosques in Syria
- List of mosques in Aleppo
