= Al-Rukniyah Madrasa =

Coordinates: 33°32′4.5″N 36°17′39″E

- الْمَدْرَسَة الرُّكْنِيَّة
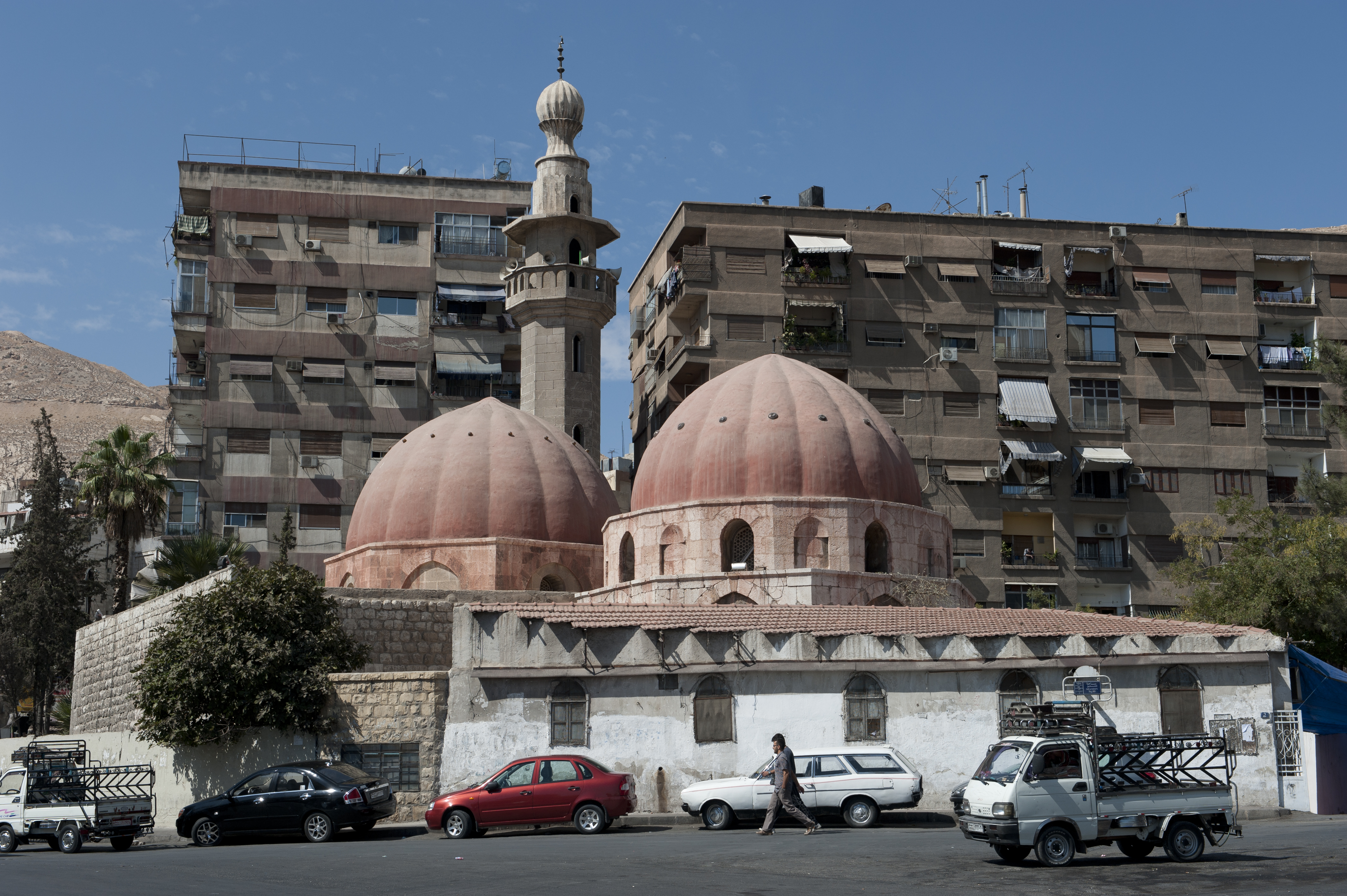

Location
- Al-Akrad neighborhood, Al-Salihiyah quarter Damascus; Syria

Information
- Type: madrasa
- Established: 1224 AD
- Founder: Rukn al-Din Mankuris al-Falaki
- Campus: Urban
- Affiliation: Islamic

Al-Rukniyah Madrasa (Arabic: الْمَدْرَسَة الرُّكْنِيَّة, romanized: al-Madrasah ar-Ruknīyah) is a 13th-century madrasa located in Damascus, Syria.

== Gallery ==
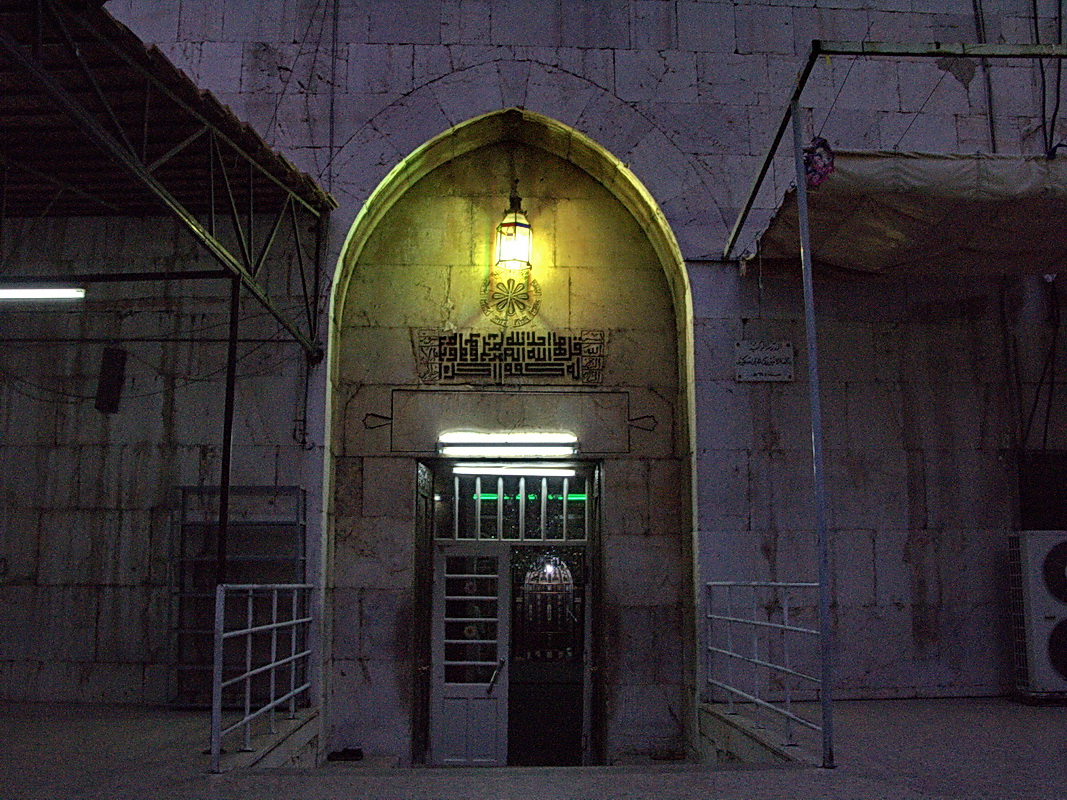
Interior

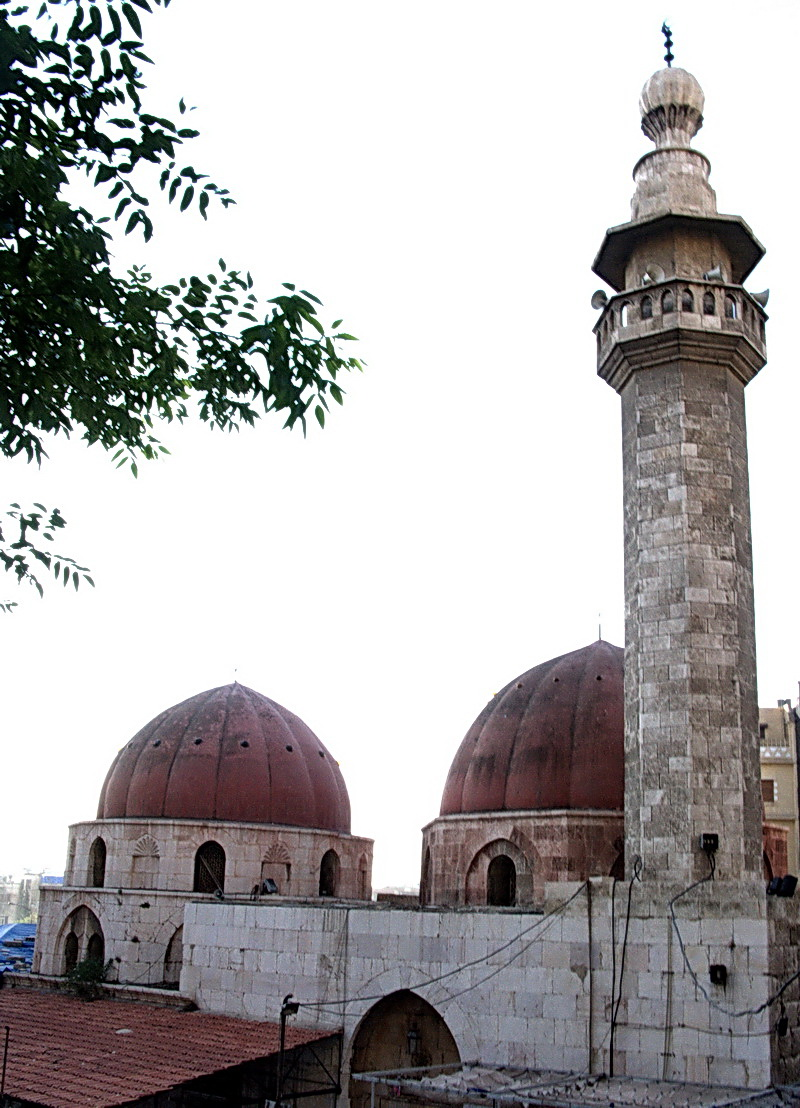
Minaret and domes

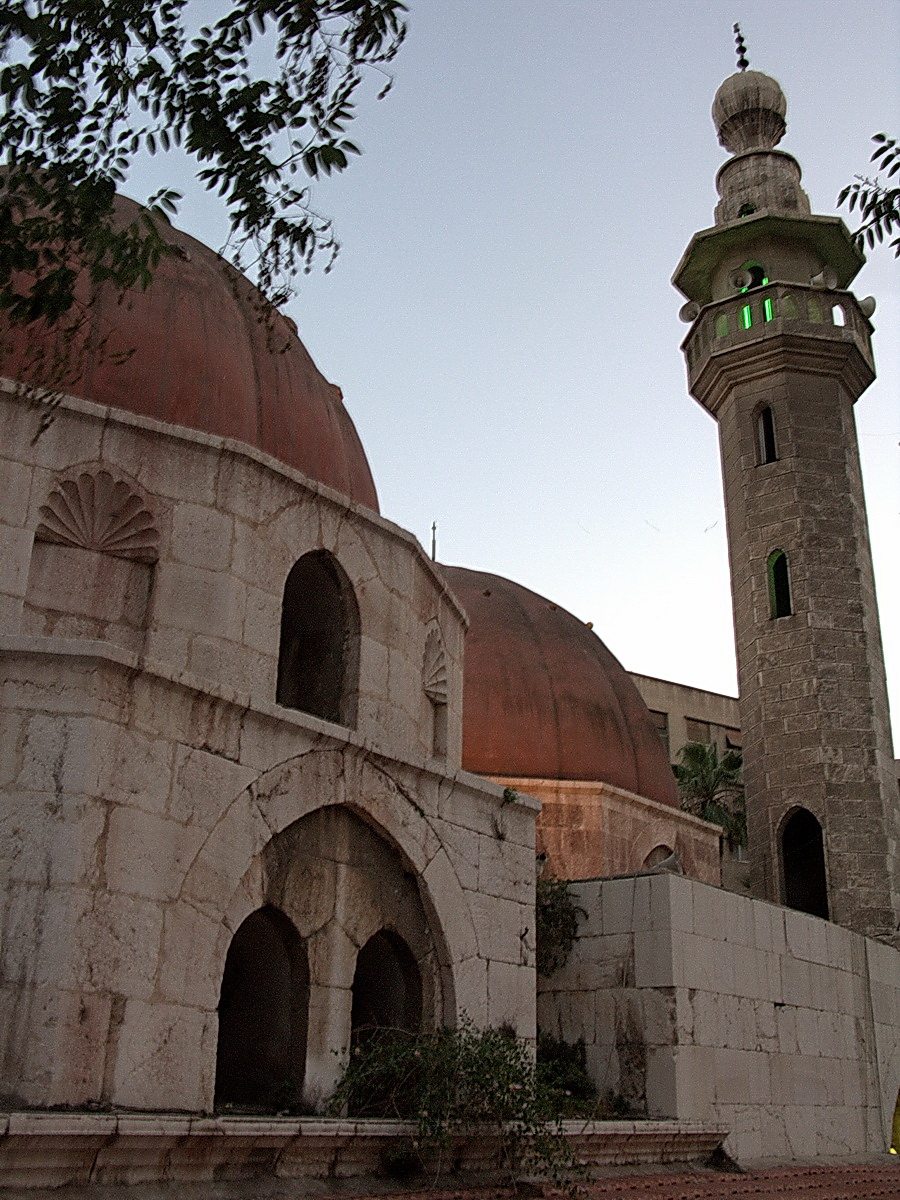
Minaret and domes

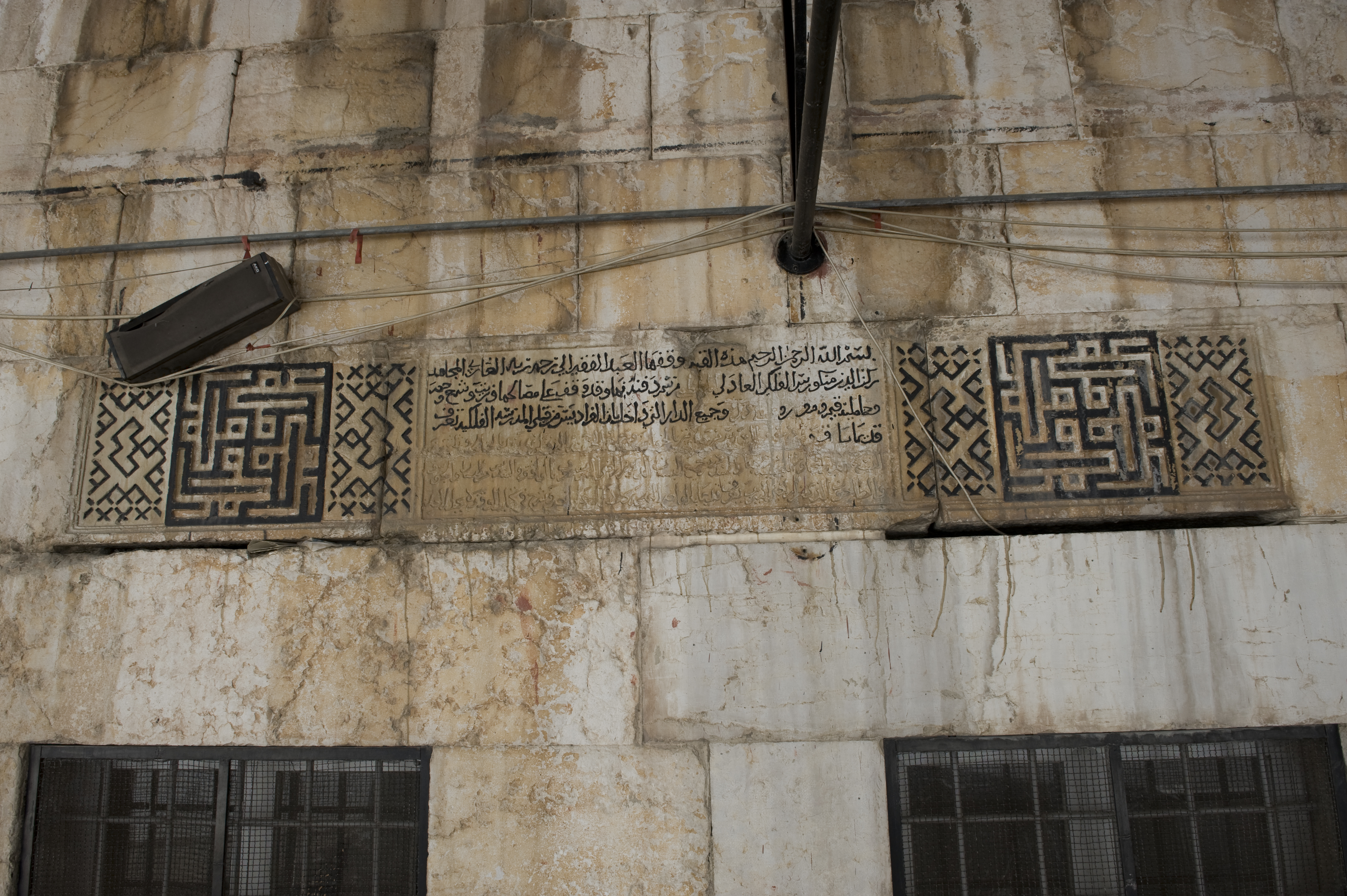
An inscription attributing the building to the Ayyubid emir Rukn al-Din Mankuris al-Faliki

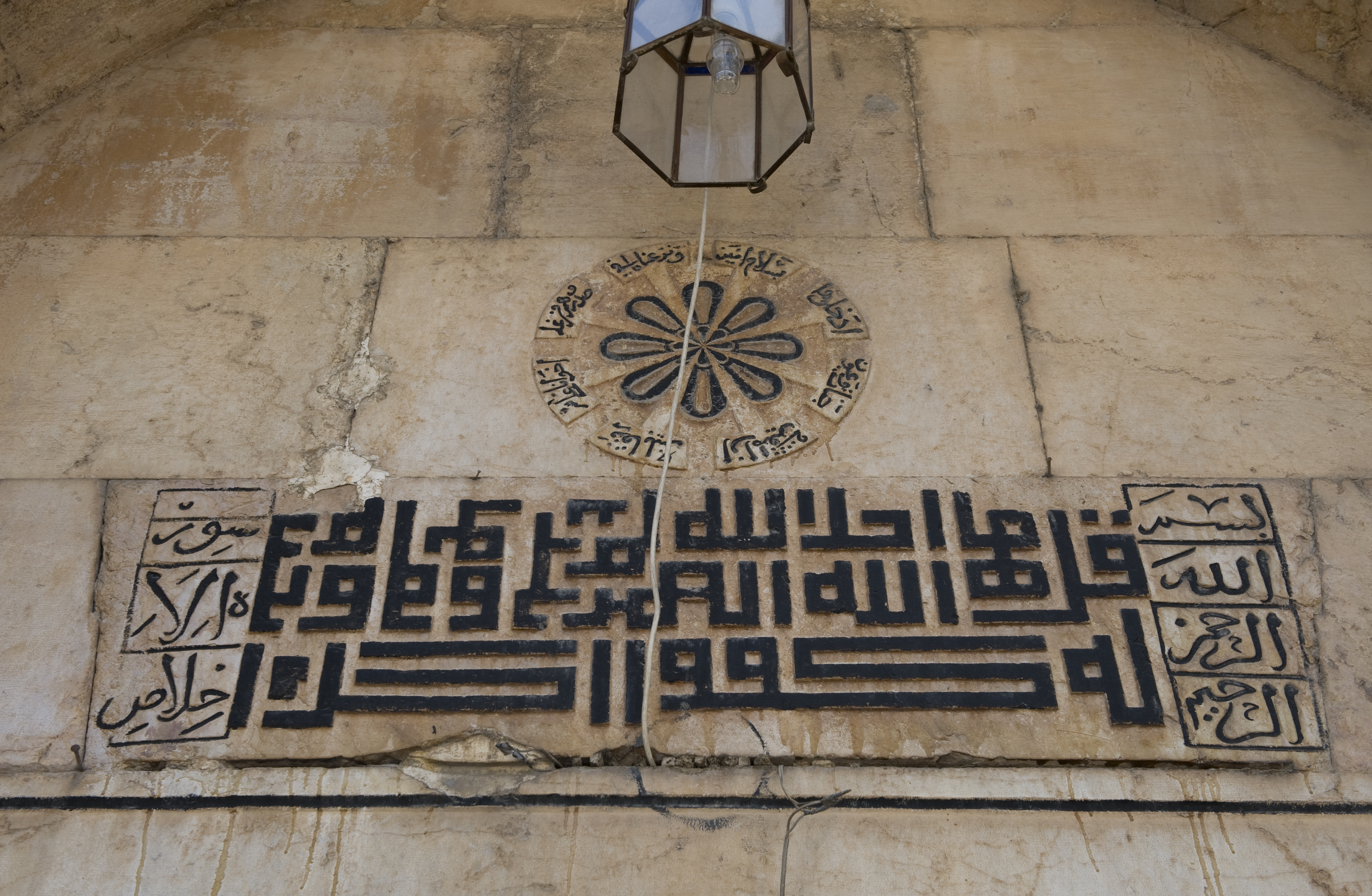

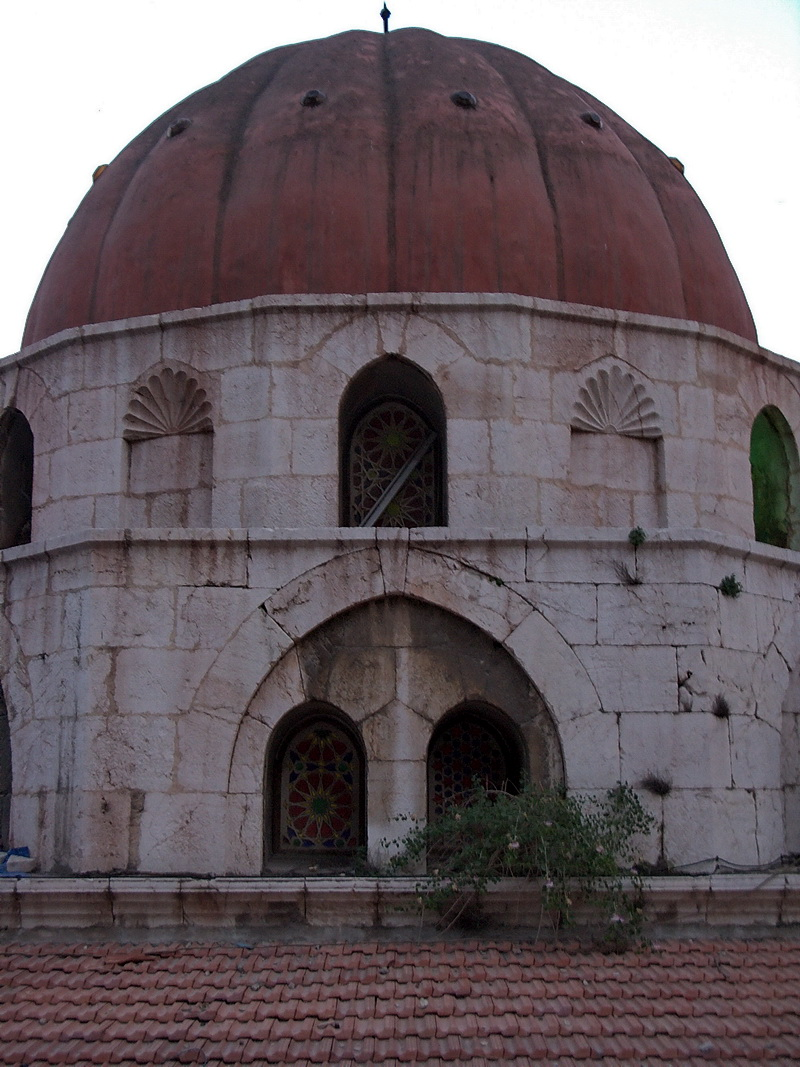

== See also ==
- Al-Adiliyah Madrasa
- Az-Zahiriyah Library
- Nur al-Din Madrasa
- List of Mosques in Damascus
