= Tankiz Mosque =

Mosque in Damascus, Syria

- جامع تنكز
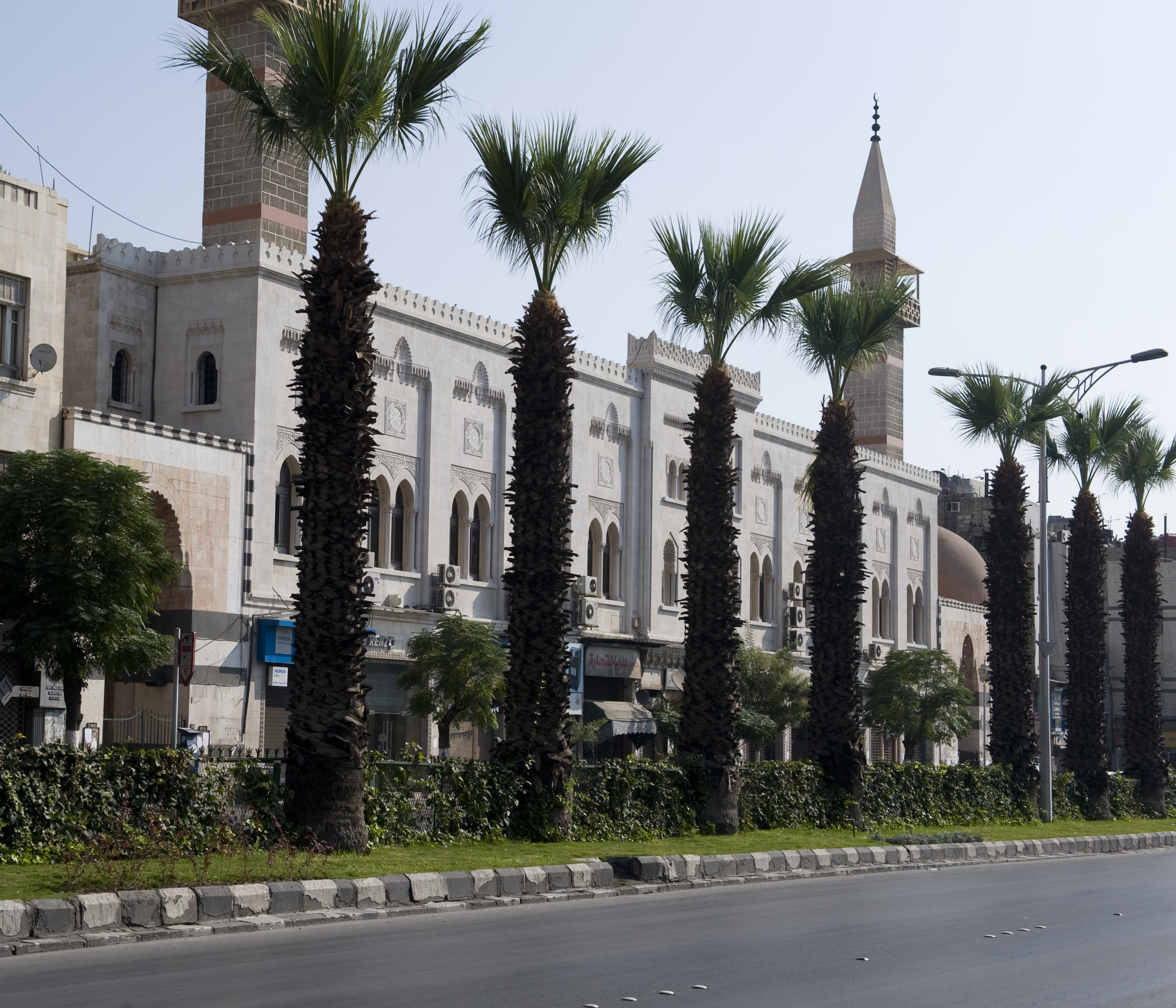
- The southern facade from Al-Nasir Street

Religion
- Affiliation: Islam
- Ecclesiastical or organisational status: Mosque
- Status: Active

Location
- Location: Damascus, Damascus Governorate
- Country: Syria
- Interactive map of Tankiz Mosque
- Coordinates: 33°30′43″N 36°17′51″E

Architecture
- Type: Mosque
- Style: Mamluk
- Completed: 1317–1318 CE (first); 1951 (current)
- Minaret: 3

Tankiz Mosque (Arabic: جامع تنكز, romanized: Jāmiʿ Tankiz) is a mosque in Damascus, Syria, It was originally built in the 14th century, but was later rebuilt completely in the 20th century, only two portals and the northern minaret remain of the original building.

== History ==
Built between 1317–1318 under the Mamluk viceroy of Syria Sayf Al-din Tankiz al-Husami an-Nasiri, located on An-Naser Street near the Marjeh Square and west of the Citadel of Damascus. A mausoleum was built next to the mosque which is known for its Mihrab with Umayyad-style mosaics. In 1831, Ibrahim Pasha of Egypt converted the mosque into a military barracks. During the French mandate, it served as a military school until 1937, when the French evacuated the site, allowing it to resume its original function as a mosque, it was later rebuilt in 1951 after the fire of 1945. Only two portals and the northern minaret remain of the original building, in addition to its adjoining mausoleum.

== See also ==
- Islam in Syria
- List of mosques in Damascus
