= Fulus Mosque =

Mosque in Damascus, Syria

- مسجد فلوس

Religion
- Affiliation: Islam
- Ecclesiastical or organisational status: Mosque
- Status: Active

Location
- Location: Damascus, Damascus Governorate
- Country: Syria
- Interactive map of Fulus Mosque
- Coordinates: 33°29′52″N 36°18′00″E

Architecture
- Type: Mosque
- Style: Fatimid
- Completed: 11th century
- Minaret: 1

Fulus Mosque (Arabic: مسجد فلوس, romanized: Masjid Fulūs) or Abu Fulus Mosque, is an 11th century Fatimid era mosque in Al-Midan District of Damascus, Syria. It is famous for its Fatimid floral stucco decorations on its mihrab.

== See also ==
- Islam in Syria
- List of mosques in Damascus
