= Al-Muallaq Mosque (Damascus) =

Mosque in Damascus, Syria

- المسجد المعلق
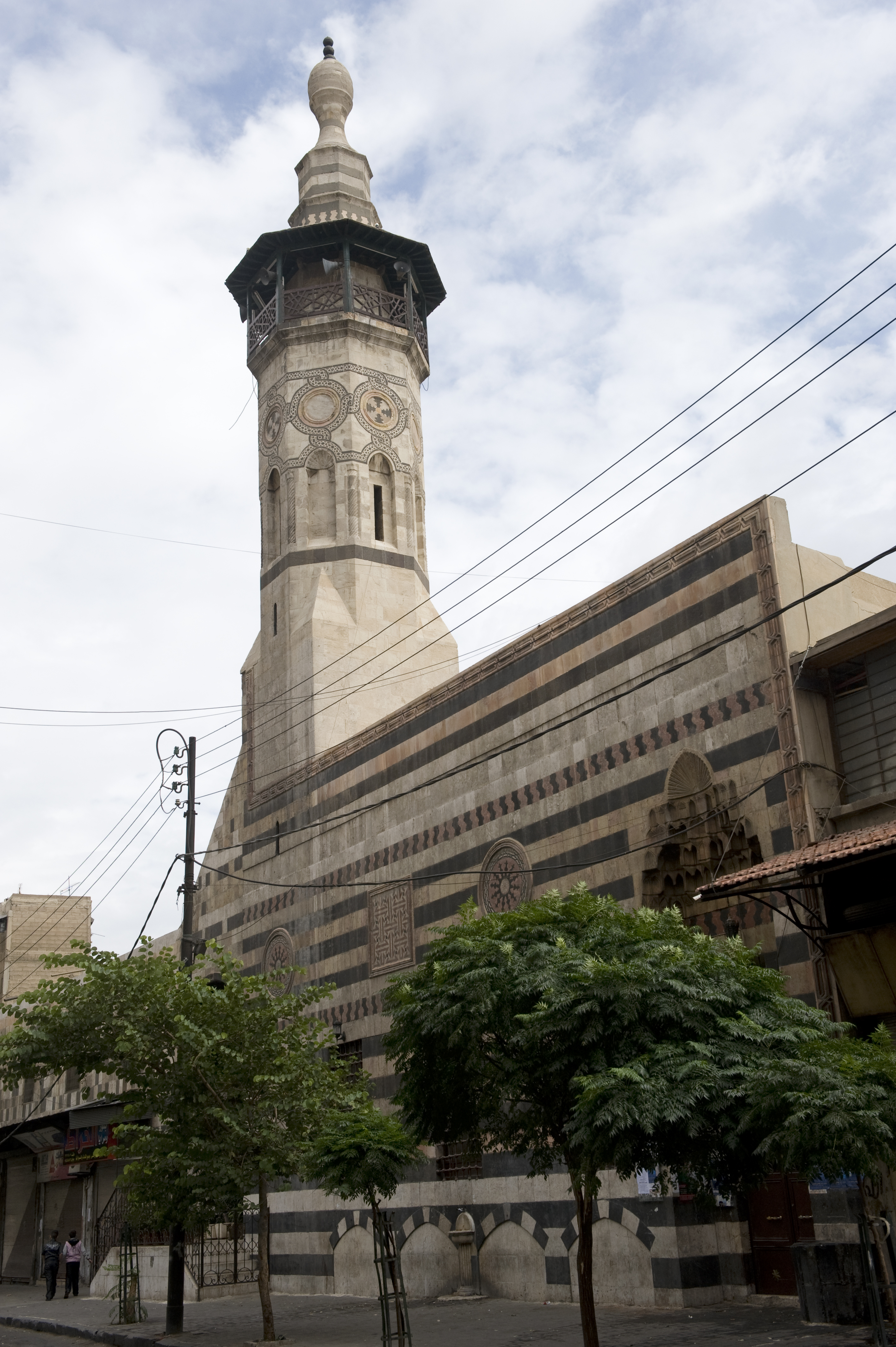
- courtyard of the mosque

Religion
- Affiliation: Islam
- Ecclesiastical or organizational status: Mosque
- Status: Active

Location
- Location: Damascus, Damascus Governorate
- Country: Syria
- Interactive map of Al-Muallaq Mosque
- Coordinates: 33°30′49″N 36°18′17″E

Architecture
- Type: Mosque
- Style: Mamluk
- Completed: 1458
- Minaret: 1

Al-Muallaq Mosque or Muallaq Mosque (Arabic: المسجد المعلق, romanized: Al-Masjid Al-Muʿallaq, lit. 'The Hanging Mosque') is a 15th century Mamluk era mosque in Damascus, Syria, built in 1458. It lies adjacent to the Barada River.

== Gallery ==
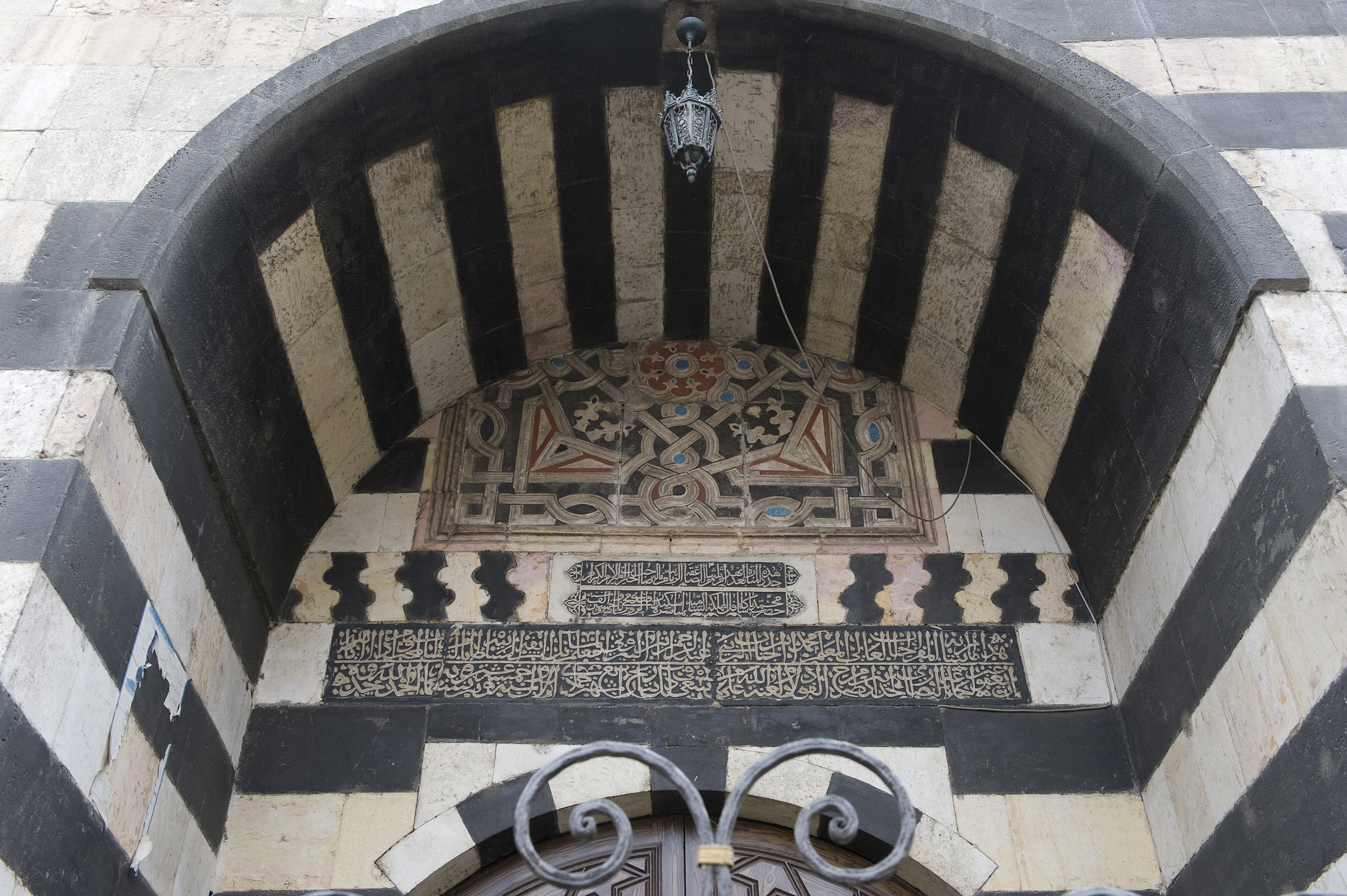

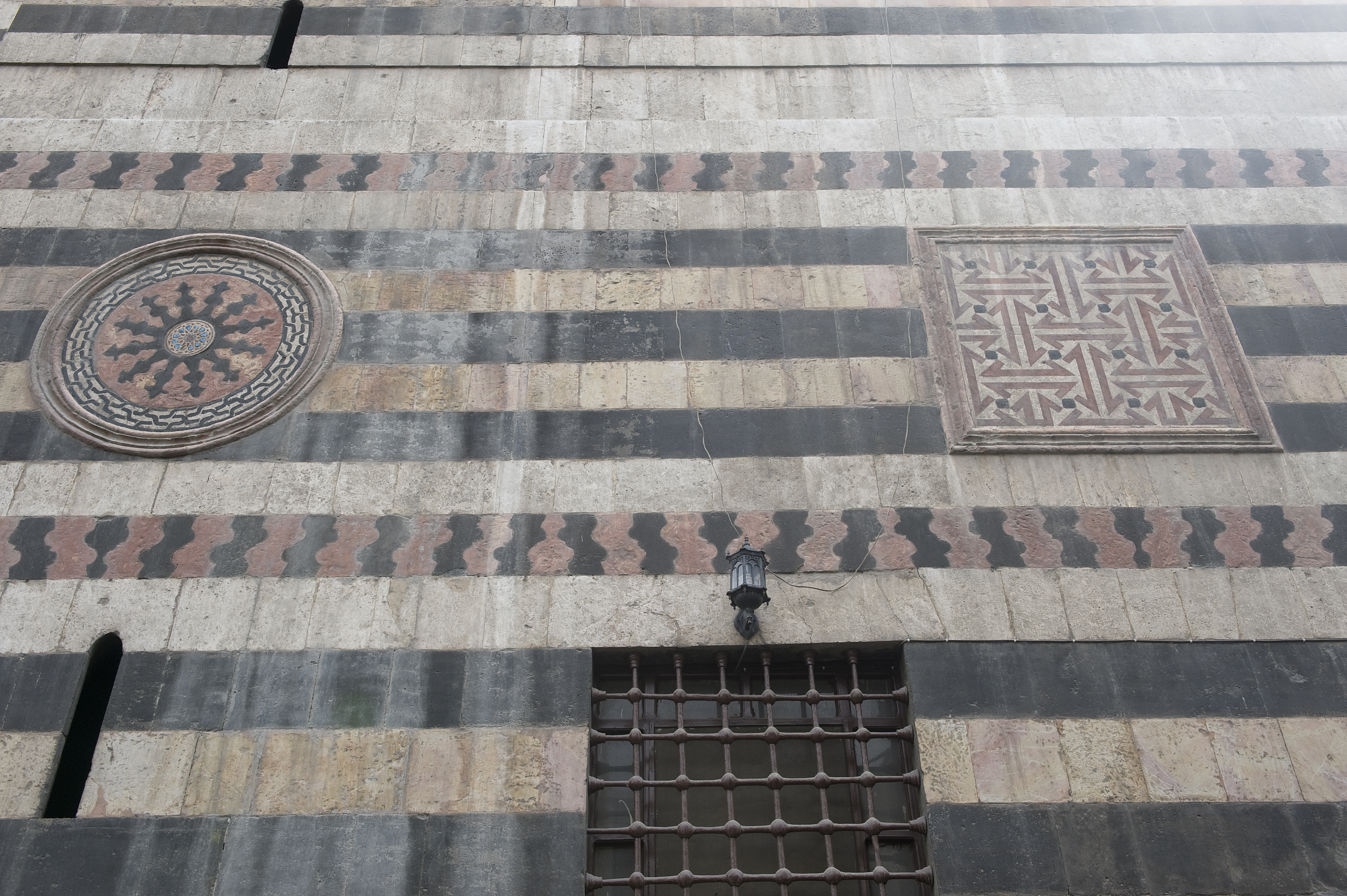

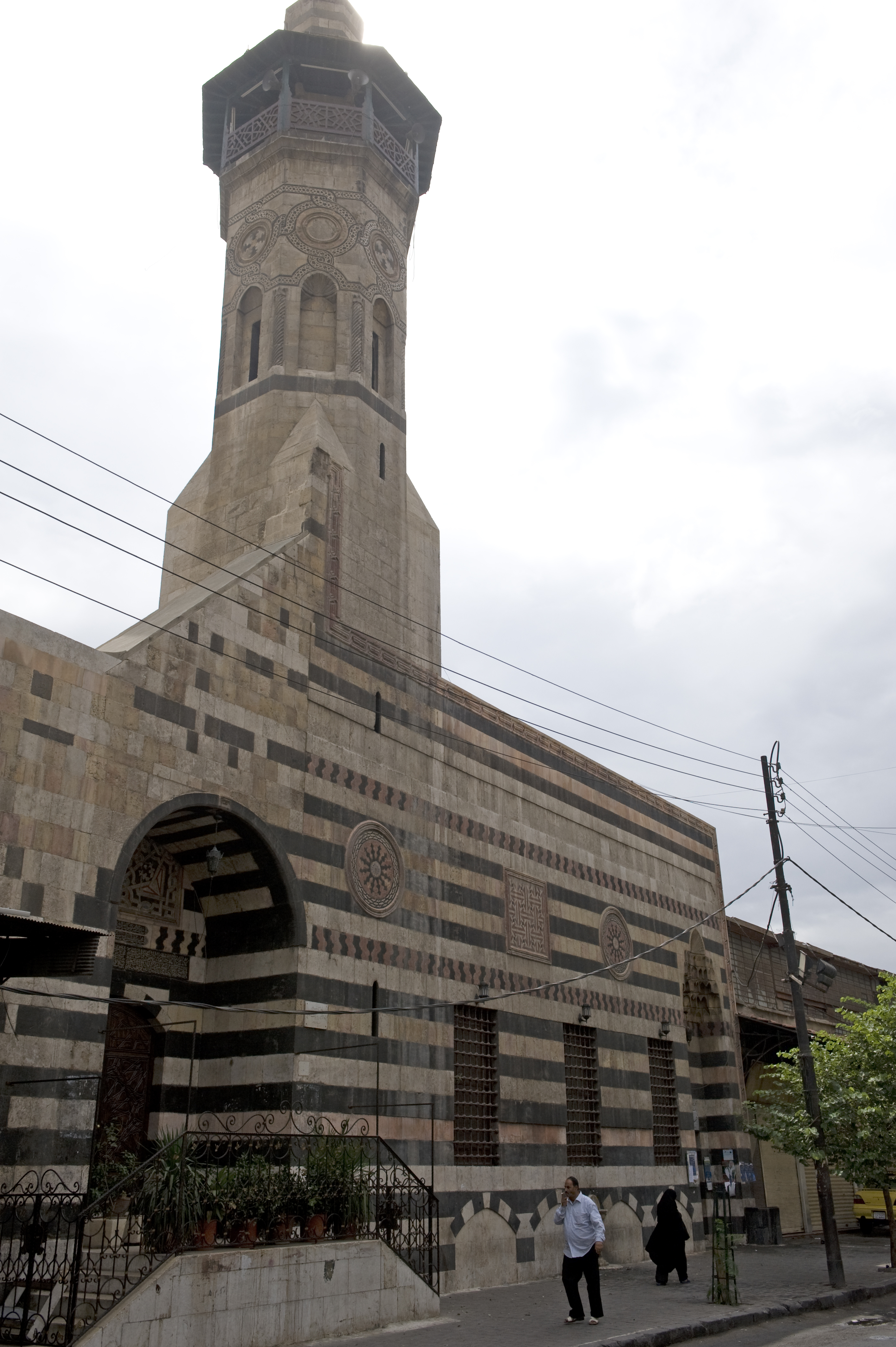

== See also ==
- Islam in Syria
- List of mosques in Damascus
