= Arab Academy of Damascus =

Syrian organization

The Arab Academy of Damascus (Arabic: مجمع اللغة العربية بدمشق, romanized: Majmaʻ al-Lughah al-ʻArabīyah bi-Dimashq) is the oldest academy regulating the Arabic language, established in 1918 during the reign of Faisal I of Syria. It is based in al-Adiliyah Madrasa, and is modeled on the language academies of Europe, and founded with an explicit reference to the example of the Académie française. It focussed on researching Arab culture and history and Arabic, publishing in Arabic and proclaiming its scientific nature.

Arabization was the major mission of the academy after a long period of Ottoman domination and use of Ottoman Turkish in major parts of the Arab world. Since its establishment, it has been operated by notable committees of Arabic language professors, scholars and experts who re-spread the use of Arabic in the state's institutions and daily life of many Arab countries by adapting widely accepted proceedings and records into Arabic.

The academy was not an institute only for Arabs. The academy wished to be on equal footing to European academies and published monthly notes on other academies as well as enlisting leading European orientalists.

The academy has had the following directors:

1. Muhammad Kurd Ali (1919–1953)
2. Khalil Mardam Bey (1953–1959)
3. Prince Mustafa Shahabi (1959–1968)
4. Husni Sabh (1968–1986)
5. Shaker Al-Fahham (1986–2008)
6. Marwan Mahasne (2008–2022)
7. Mahmoud Ahmed Al-Sayed (2022–current)

As of 2011, its library contains some 15,000 volumes and 500 manuscripts.

== Resources ==
- Arab Academy of Damascus, From Answers
- Versteegh, Kees. The Arabic Language. New York: Edinburgh UP, 2001. Print. Page 178.
- Rachad Hamzaoui, L’Académie Arabe de Damas et le problème de la modernisation de la langue arabe, Leiden: Brill, 1965.
