= Jarrah Mosque =

Mosque in Damascus, Syria

- جامع جراح

Religion
- Affiliation: Islam
- Ecclesiastical or organisational status: Mosque
- Status: Active

Location
- Location: Damascus, Damascus Governorate
- Country: Syria
- Interactive map of Jarrah Mosque
- Coordinates: 33°30′19″N 36°18′20″E

Architecture
- Type: Mosque
- Style: Ayyubid
- Completed: 1233
- Minaret: 1

Jarrah Mosque (Arabic: جامع جَرَّاح, romanized: Jāmiʿ Jarrāḥ) is a 13th century mosque in Damascus, Syria.

== History ==
Located just south of Damascus and slightly west of Bab al-Saghir Gate, the mosque adjoins the historic Bab al-Saghir Cemetery, the burial place of many prominent Damascenes. As a destination for pilgrims, it likely served as a cemetery mosque. The mosque was originally built in 1182 during the reign of Saladin. It was later renovated by Jarrah Al-Mudahhi, after whom it is named, and underwent a further expansion and renovation in 1233 under the patronage of Al-Ashraf Musa ibn al-Adil.

A fire damaged the mosque late in 642 AH (1244–1245), and the emir Mujahid al-Din Muhammad ibn Qilij al-Nuri rebuilt it in 652 AH (1254–1255). After another fire in 974 AH (1566–1567), Kamal al-Hamzawi, the naqib al-ashraf of Damascus, paid for repairs and gave the building a plain prayer hall on the south side and a courtyard on the north. The minaret over the entrance was damaged by an earthquake in 1173 AH (1759–1760) and was then rebuilt.

== Architecture ==
The mosque has a nearly square plan, organized around a small courtyard enclosed by arcades on three sides and opening onto a simple prayer hall through three arched entrances. Flanking windows overlook the courtyard and its central ablution basin. The prayer hall consists of a single rectangular bay aligned with the qibla, covered by a simple timber-trussed roof and largely devoid of ornament.

== See also ==
- List of mosques in Damascus
- Islam in Syria
