= Bab Musalla Mosque =

Mosque in Damascus, Syria

- جامع باب مصلى

Religion
- Affiliation: Islam
- Ecclesiastical or organisational status: Mosque
- Status: Active

Location
- Location: Damascus, Damascus Governorate
- Country: Syria
- Interactive map of Bab Musalla Mosque
- Coordinates: 33°30′01.8″N 36°18′04.3″E

Architecture
- Type: Mosque
- Style: Ayyubid
- Completed: 1209–1210
- Minaret: 1

Bab Musalla Mosque or Bab Al-Musalla Mosque (Arabic: جامع باب مصلى, romanized: Jāmiʿ Bāb Muṣallā) is a 13th century mosque in Damascus, Syria.

== History ==
The site where the mosque stands marked the edge of Damascus (now in Al-Midan district) and had served as the location for the city's Eid prayers since the Islamic conquest by the commander Abu Ubayda ibn al-Jarrah. In 1209–1210, Al-Adil I ordered the construction of the mosque adjacent to the older Al-Naranj Mosque, establishing a new religious complex on this historically significant site.

== Architecture ==
It was originally a simple mosque consisting of four walls, a mihrab and a minbar with stones, with no roof. In 1217, a dome was added, along with two additional bays (arches), and a simple Ayyubid-style minaret was constructed, expanding and enhancing the original structure.

== See also ==
- List of mosques in Damascus
- Islam in Syria
