= Zahiriyya Library =

Historic monument and mausoleum in Damascus, Syria

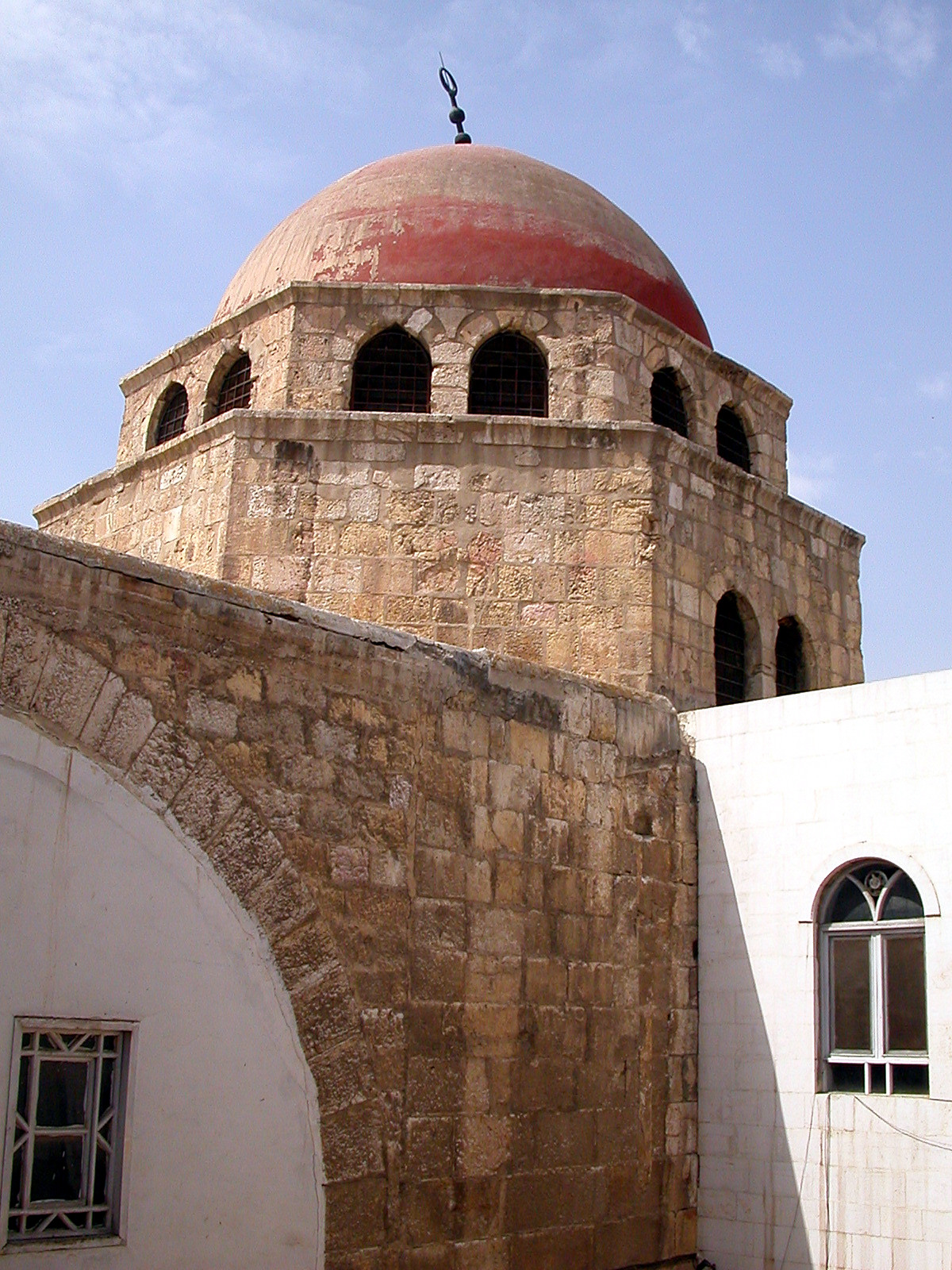
- Entrance to the Zahiriyya Madrasa and Library
- Interactive map of Zahiriyya Library
- 33°30′44.5″N 36°18′18.5″E
- Location: Damascus, Syria

History
- Founder: Sultan al-Malik al-Sa'id (son of Baybars)
- Built: 1277-1281
- Built for: Sultan al-Zahir Baybars (his tomb)
- Original use: madrasa, mausoleum

Site notes
- Architect: Ibrahim ibn Ghana'im al-Muhandis
- Architectural styles: Mamluk, Islamic
- Current use: public library

The Zahiriyya Library (Arabic: المكتبة الظاهرية, romanized: al-Maktaba ẓ-Ẓāhiriyya), also known as the Zahiriyya Madrasa (Arabic: الْمَدْرَسَة الظَّاهِرِيَّة, romanized: al-Madrasa ẓ-Ẓāhiriyya), is an Islamic library, madrasa, and mausoleum in Damascus, Syria. It was established in 1277, taking its name from the Mamluk sultan Baybars al-Zahir (r. 1260–1277), who is buried in this place.

== The funerary complex of al-Zahir Baybars ==
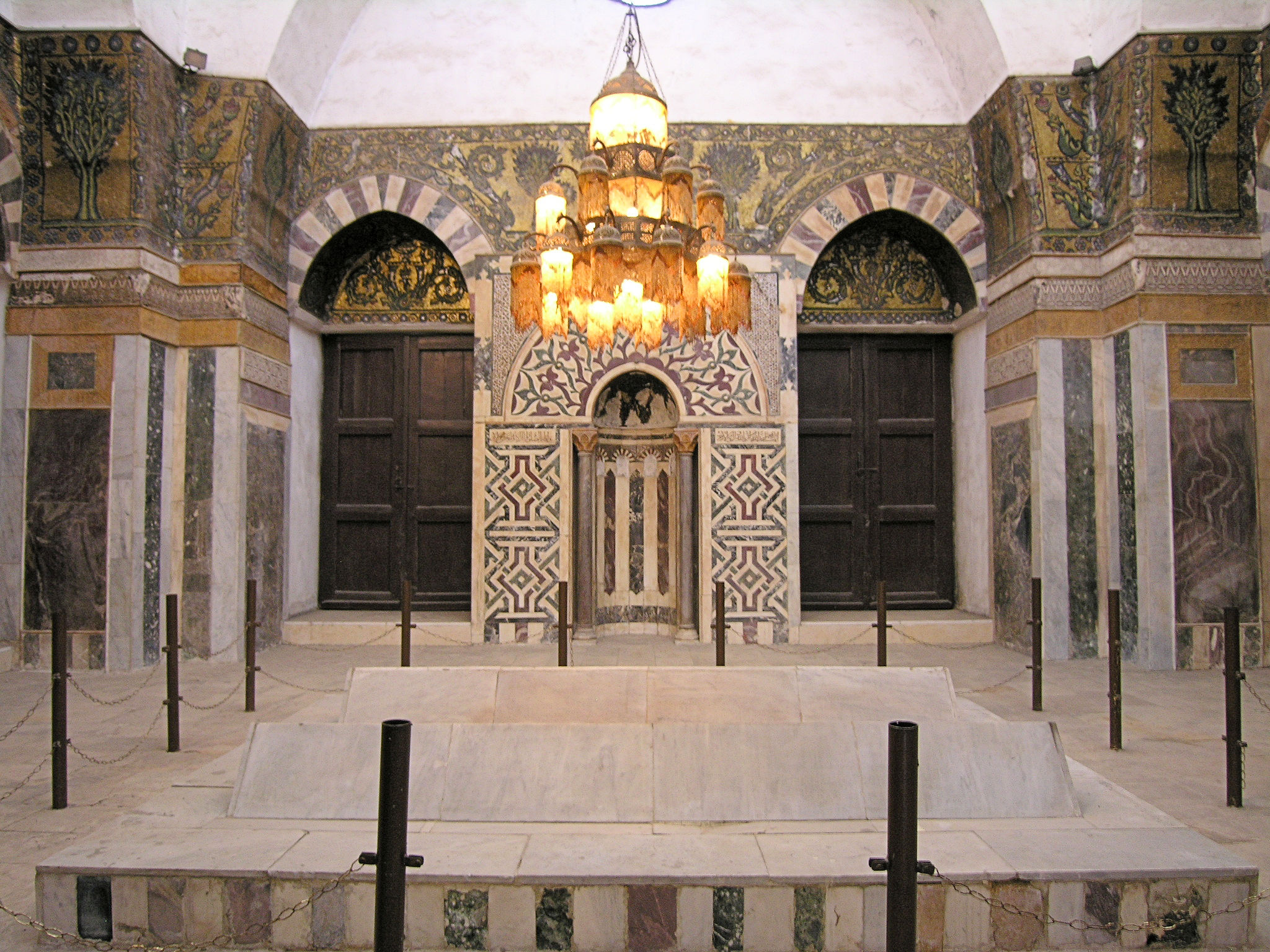
The mausoleum chamber of Baybars.

=== Background: Sultan al-Zahir Baybars ===
Sultan Al-Zahir Baybars, also known as Rukn Uddin Baybrus (full name: al-Malik al-Zahir Rukn al-Din Baibars al-Bunduqdari) was a political and military leader of major historical importance. He played an important role in the establishment of a new mamluk-based regime in Cairo that would rule Egypt and Syria for a long period known as the Mamluk Sultanate (1250–1517). After playing a central role in repelling the Mongol advance at the Battle of Ain Jalut in 1260 (often cited as a turning point in history) he rose to the position of sultan. During his reign, he undertook a series of effective campaigns against the remaining Crusader states in the Levant, conquering a number of important cities and fortresses such as Antioch and the famous Krak des Chevaliers, which paved the way for the later final demise of the Crusader presence in the region.

Baybars died unexpectedly in July 1277 in his palace (called al-Qasr al-Ablaq) in Damascus after drinking a poisoned cup that was intended for someone else. His death was kept a secret and he was temporarily buried in the Citadel of Damascus while arrangements could be made for his permanent burial and for a transition of power to his 18-year-old son al-Sa'id Barakah. Baybars had reportedly expressed a desire to be buried near the town of Darayya, but his son judged that he should be buried in a more prestigious location near the great mosque and near the tombs of illustrious Ayyubid sultans, including the Mausoleum of Salah ad-Din. On al-Sa'id's orders, the governor of Damascus, emir Aydamur, purchased a house opposite the 'Adiliyya Madrasa, in the al-Amara neighbourhood near the Great Umayyad Mosque. The house, called Dar al-'Aqiqi, had originally belonged to the father of Salah ad-Din (Saladin), and Salah ad-Din himself had spent part of his childhood there. It was remodeled into a madrasa and funerary complex. When al-Sa'id himself died in 1280, he was buried in the same mausoleum as his father.

=== The madrasa and mausoleum ===
Construction of the complex began in 1277 but did not finish until later. It was still unfinished when al-Sa'id died and was buried here in 1280, and the new sultan al-Mansur Qalawun was required to see to its completion. This may have been accomplished in 1281, with the mausoleum's decoration probably being the last element to be executed. The architect of the complex was Ibrahim ibn Ghana'im al-Muhandis, who was also responsible for building al-Qasr al-Ablaq, the palace of Baybars in Damascus, in 1264.

Like many subsequent Mamluk foundations, the funerary complex of Baybars served multiple functions, which were outlined in its waqf (trust agreement for charitable foundations under Islamic law). It included two madrasas (teaching Islamic law), a Dar al-Hadith (school for teaching the sayings of the Prophet), and the sultan's mausoleum (called a turba). The complex included a monumental portal with a broad canopy of stone-carved muqarnas (honeycomb or stalactite-like forms) culminating in a shell-like hood, considered one of the most accomplished examples of its kind in Syria. The portal and exterior of the building also demonstrates alternating layers of dark and light stone, known as ablaq masonry. Today, the portal and the mausoleum are the best-preserved historical parts of the complex.

The mausoleum is covered by a large dome and its interior is boldly decorated with marble paneling along its lower walls (dadoes) and a large frieze of glass mosaics along its upper walls. The mosaics are reminiscent of the more famous ones found in the Umayyad Mosque nearby, illustrating scenes of trees and palaces. However, their craftsmanship is of somewhat lesser quality, suggesting that this skill was in decline compared to earlier periods. The mihrab (a wall niche symbolizing the direction of prayer) also features an elaborate composition of marble mosaic paneling forming geometric and foliated patterns. The muqarnas portal (the earliest example of which is the Bimaristan of Nur al-Din), the marble dadoes, and (to a lesser extent) the mosaic friezes of the mausoleum were decorative elements that would recur throughout the Mamluk period after Baybars.

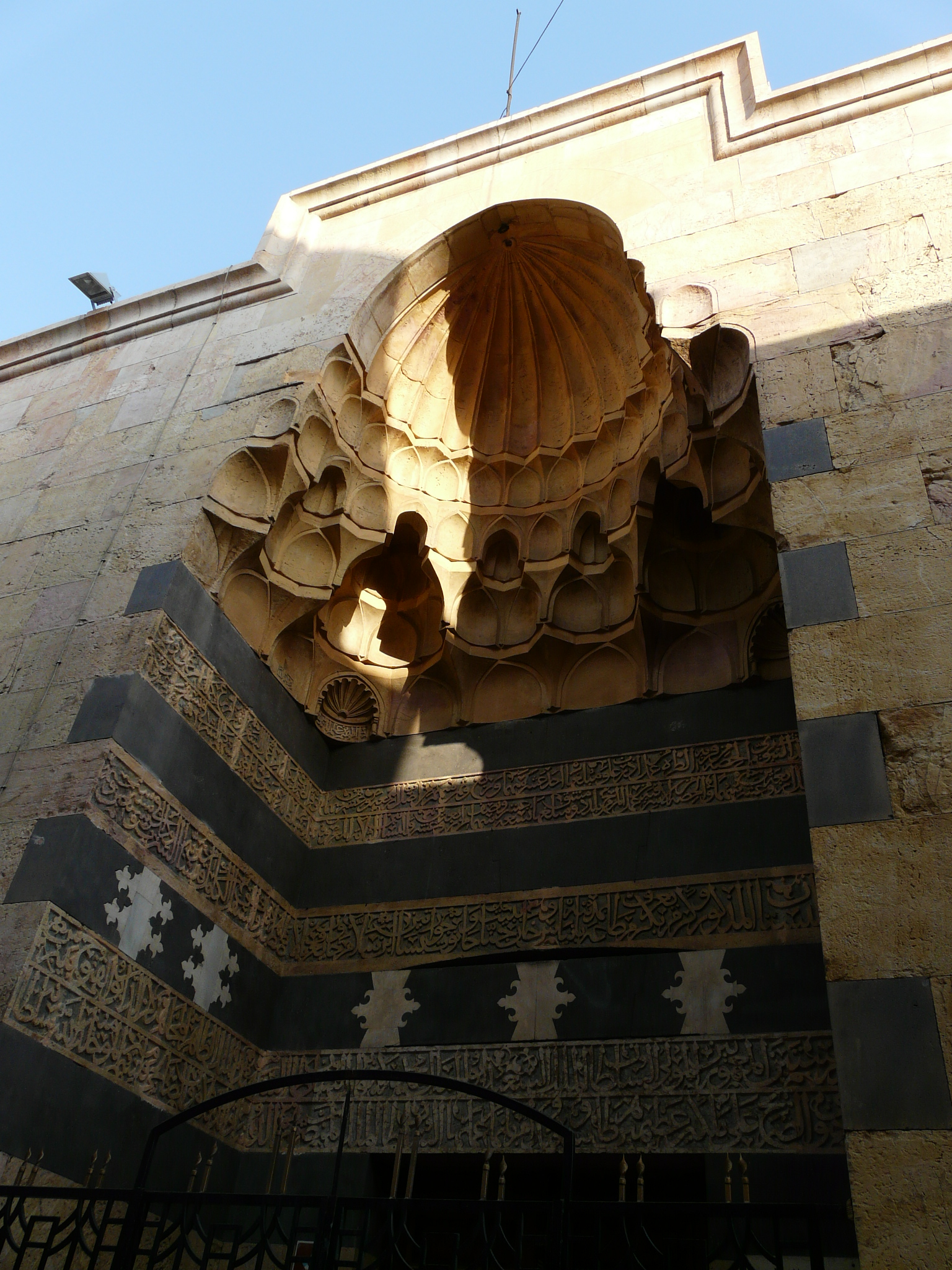
The entrance portal of the madrasa complex, composed of different coloured stone (ablaq), Arabic inscriptions, and a muqarnas canopy.

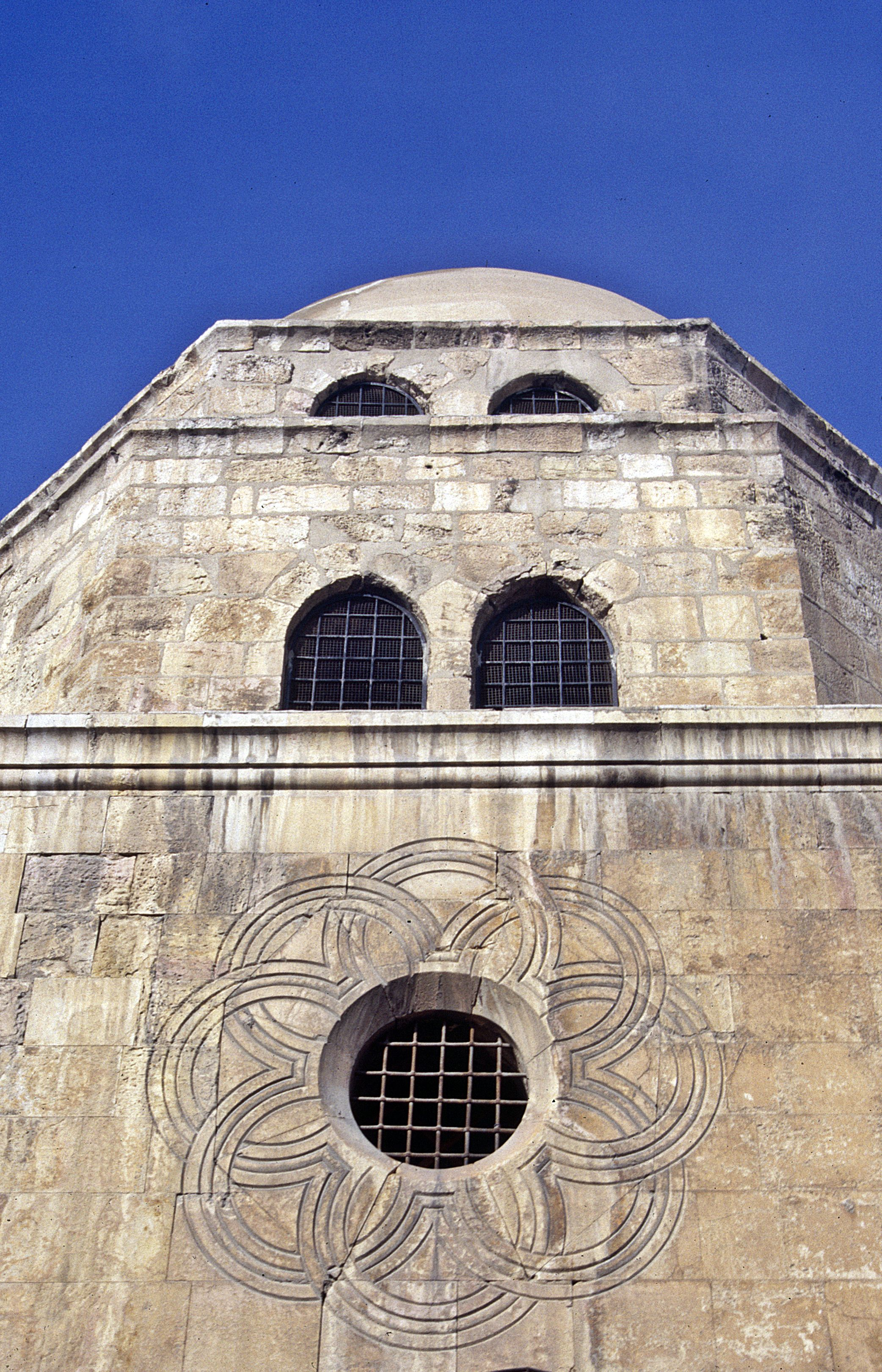
The exterior of the mausoleum's dome.

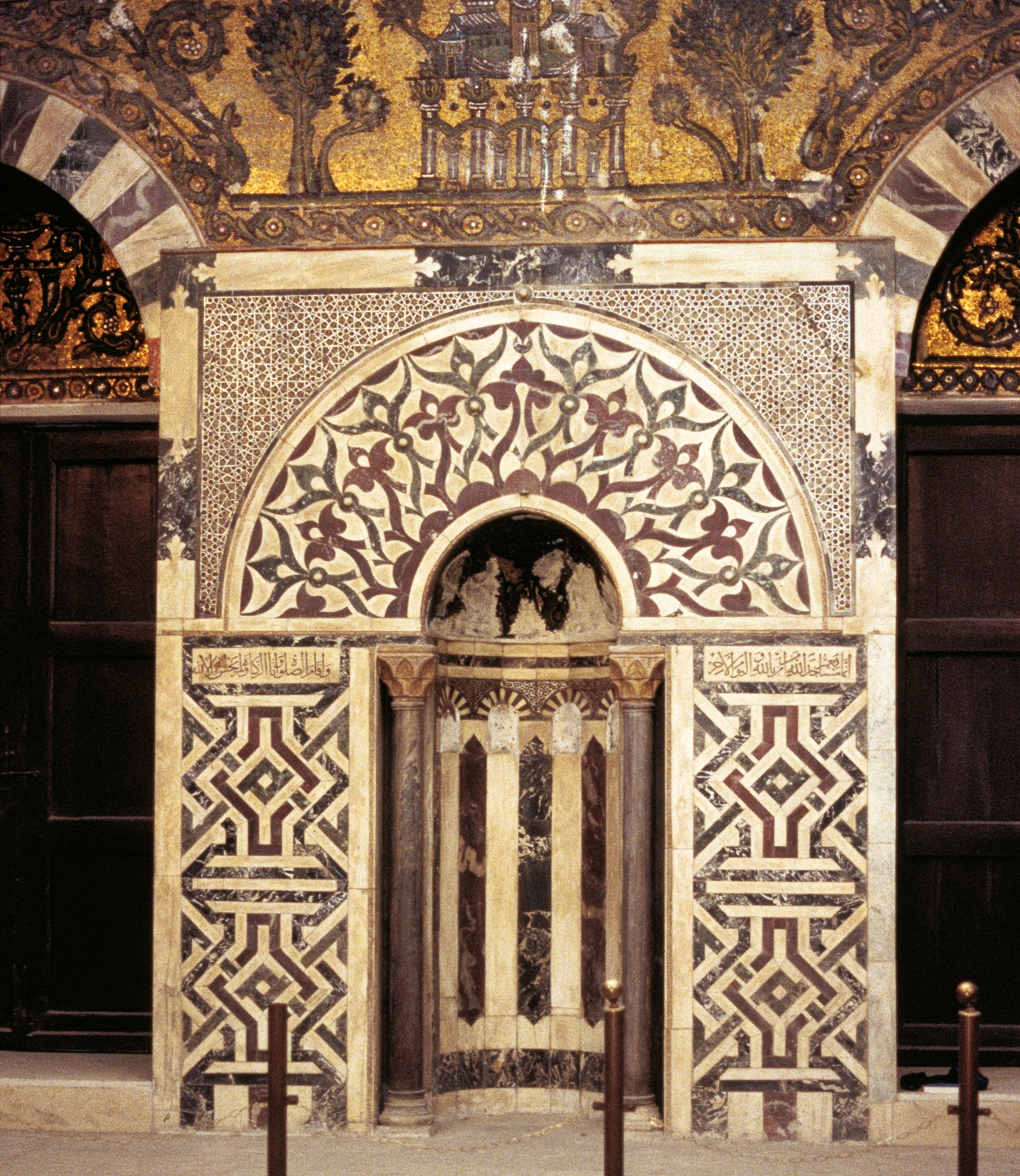
Mihrab of the mausoleum of Baybars, with marble mosaic paneling and glass mosaics above.

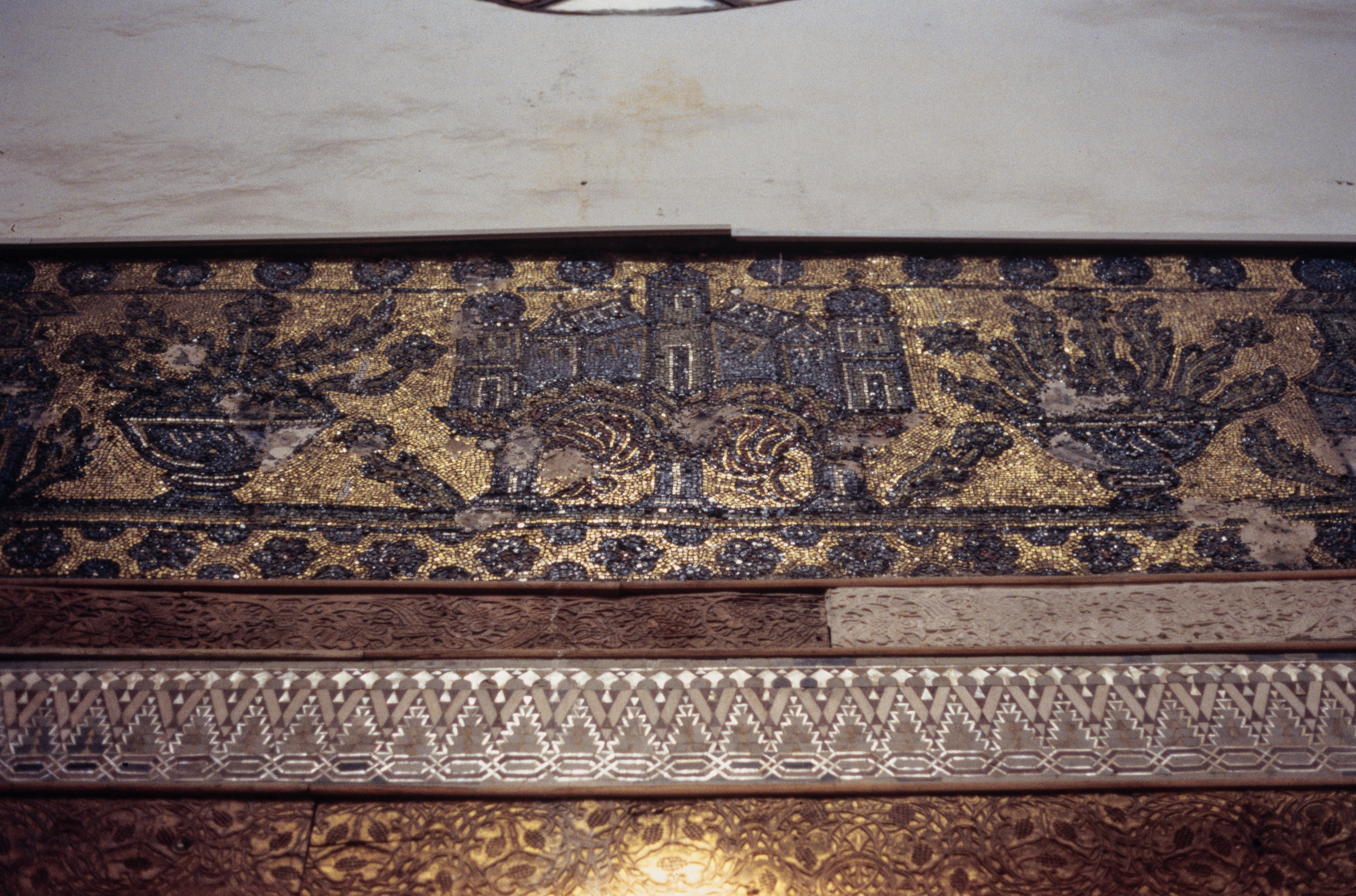
A section of the glass mosaics along the walls of the mausoleum.

== The Library ==
The madrasa had a library from the outset. Its first books were donated by the mother of al-Sa'id Barakah as part of the madrasa's endowment. It was only turned into a "general library" in 1876 or 1877 by Sheikh Tahir al-Jazairi and Salim al-Bukhari, who collected thousands of items for the library. He was helped in part by the governor of Damascus, Midhat Pasha, who used an edict from the Ottoman sultan to collect books from around the region. The library was nationally recognized by the Syrian state and opened to the public in 1880 or 1881. It continued to consolidate collections throughout the late 19th century and early 20th century and became the National Library. It played a part in the Arabic literary renaissance that was ongoing in Syria in that period.

In 1919 the "Arab Academy was charged with the supervision of the al-Zahiriyya Library. ... Its collection consisted at that time of the surviving manuscripts from different small libraries in Syria. ... The collection grew from 2,465 manuscripts to 22,000 volumes between 1919 and 1945." In 1949 a legal deposit law decreed that two copies of every work published in Syria be deposited in the library. The law was not enforced until July 1983, when a presidential decree required the deposit of 5 copies of each work published by a Syrian author. In 1984 the Al-Assad Library became the Syrian national library, replacing al-Zahiriyah Library.

The manuscript department includes over 13,000 classical Islamic manuscripts, the oldest being Imam Ahmad ibn Hanbal's Kitab al-zuhd and Kitab al-fada'il. Other notable manuscripts include Ta'rikh Dimashq by Ibn 'Asakir (1105–1175), al-Jam bayn al-gharibayn by Abu 'Ubaydah Ahmad ibn Muhammad Al-Harawi (d. 1010), and Gharib al-hadith by Ibn Qutaybah al-Dinawari (d. 889). As of 2011, the library's holdings included some 100,000 holdings, 13,000 manuscripts, and 50,000 periodicals.

== See also ==
- Baybars
- Al-Adiliyah Madrasa
- Nur al-Din Madrasa
- Mausoleum of Saladin
- Mamluk Architecture

== Sources ==
- Bloom, Jonathan M.; Blair, Sheila (2009). The Grove Encyclopedia of Islamic Art and Architecture.
