= Al-Tawba Mosque (Damascus) =

Mosque in Damascus, Syria

- جامع التوبة
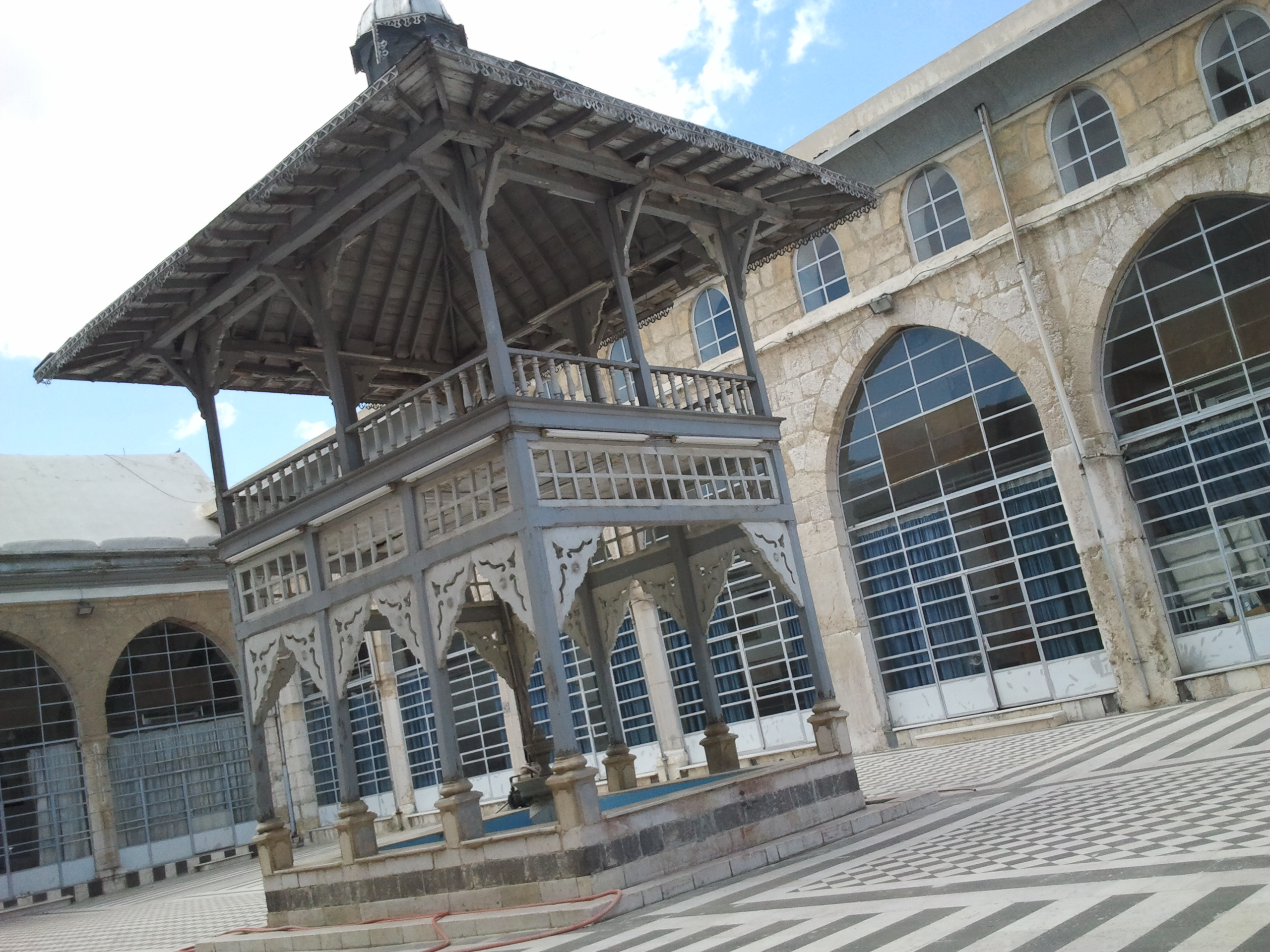
- courtyard of the mosque

Religion
- Affiliation: Islam
- Ecclesiastical or organisational status: Mosque
- Status: Active

Location
- Location: Damascus, Damascus Governorate
- Country: Syria
- Interactive map of Al-Tawba Mosque
- Coordinates: 33°30′55″N 36°18′16″E

Architecture
- Type: Mosque
- Style: Ayyubid
- Completed: 1231–1235

Specifications
- Dome: 1
- Minaret: 1

Al-Tawba Mosque or Tawba Mosque (Arabic: جامع التوبة, romanized: Jāmiʿ al-Tawbah) is a 13th century mosque in Damascus, Syria.

== History ==
Built between 1231–1235 by the Ayyubid emir Al-Ashraf Musa ibn Adil, located 200 meters northwest of the northern ancient city-gate of Bab al-Faradis. It is nicknamed "the Small Umayyad Mosque" (Arabic: الجامع الأموي الصغير, romanized: al-Jāmiʿ al-Umawī al-Ṣaghīr) because of its resemblance to the Great Umayyad Mosque in Damascus.

== Architecture ==
The mosque is said to be built on the site of a former caravanserai that had become a place of ill repute and prostitution; and perhaps to emphasize the site's re-dedication to sanctity, The plan and design of the mosque resembles that of the Umayyad Mosque, with its long, rectangular courtyard surrounded by three arcades, the prayer area consists of two long halls with a mihrab that is covered by a small dome.

== Gallery ==
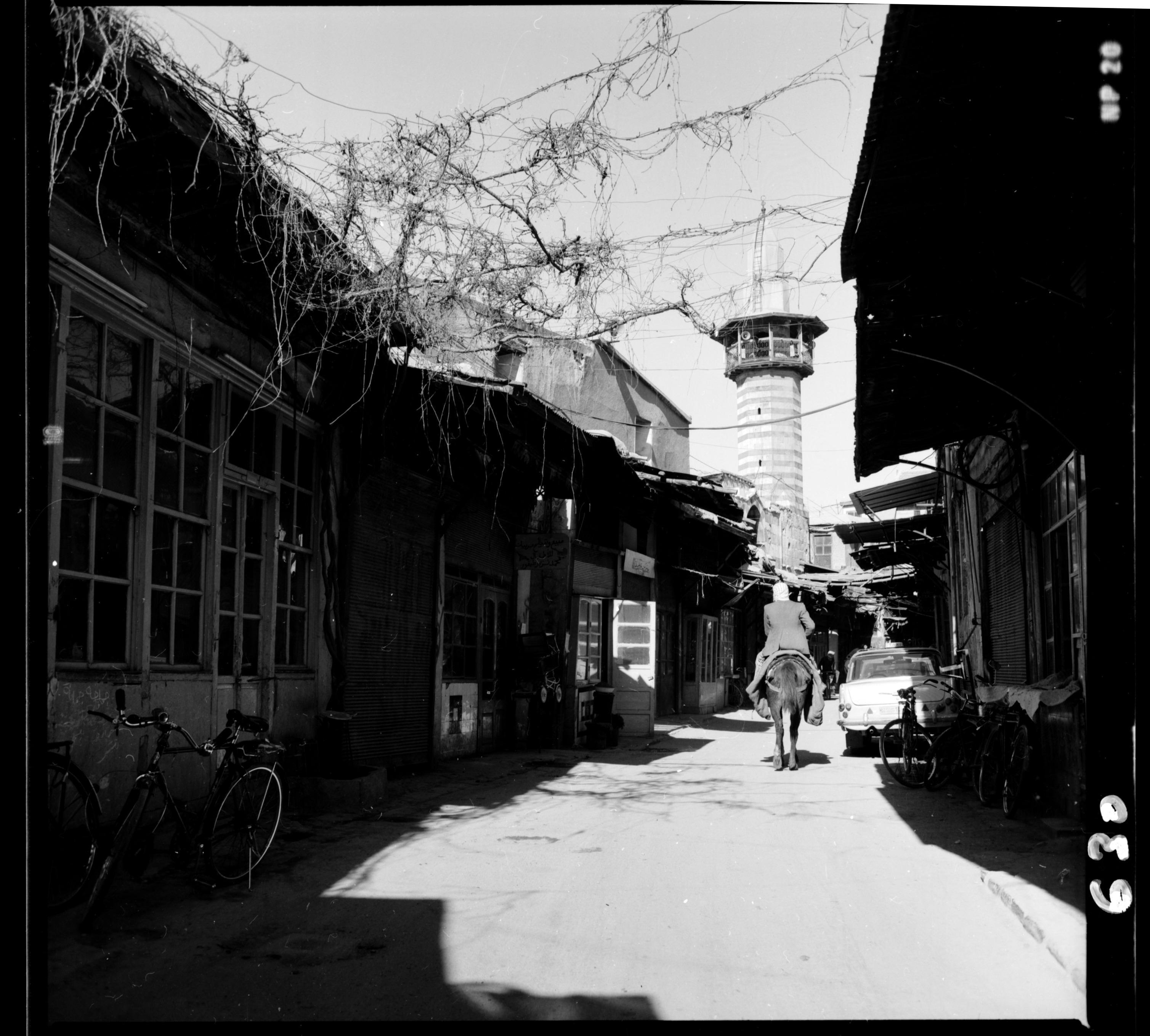
Minaret of the Mosque (1980)

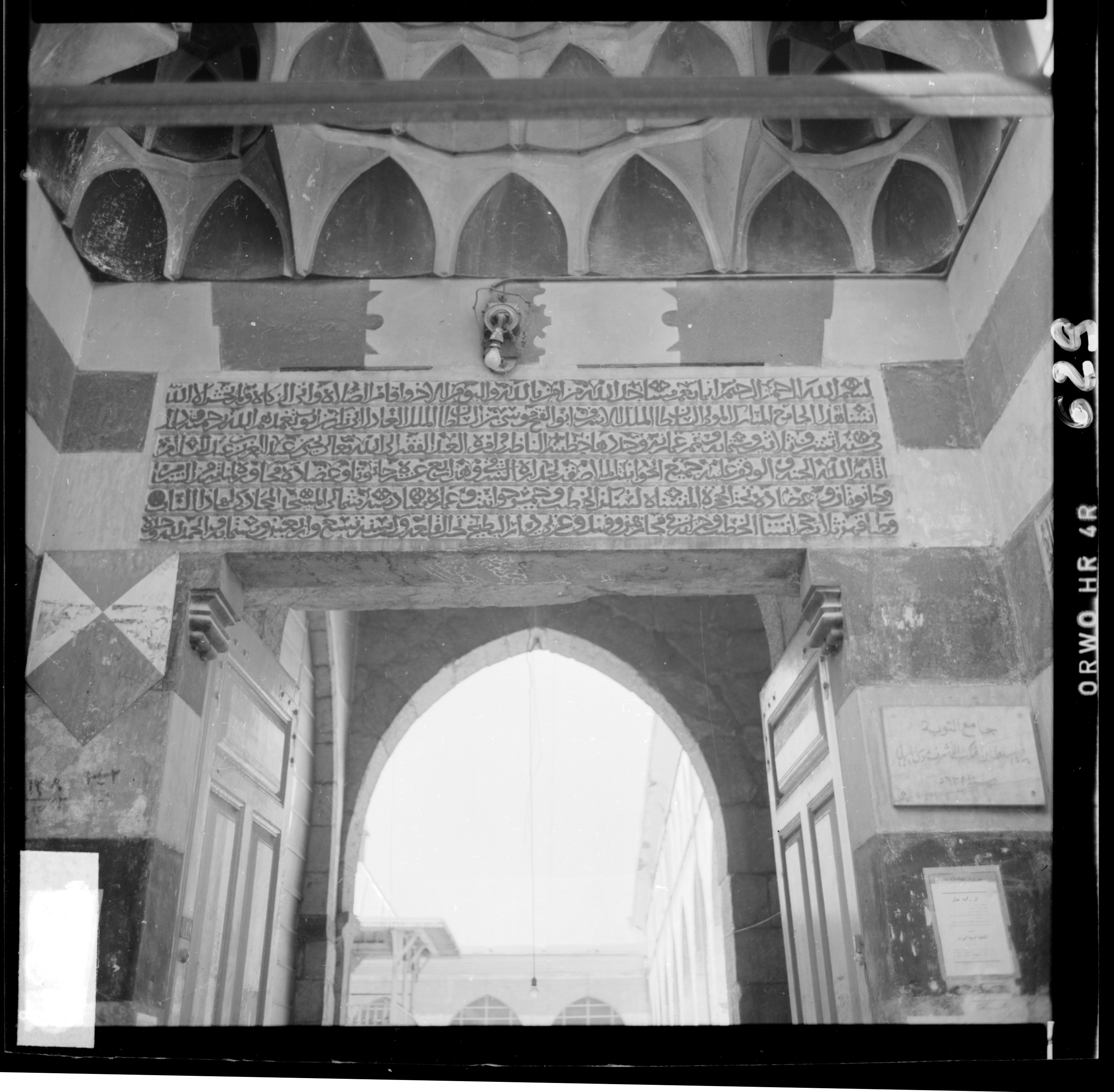
Entrance of the mosque (1980)

== See also ==
- Islam in Syria
- List of mosques in Damascus
