= Al-Jisr Al-Abyad Mosque =

Mosque in Damascus, Syria

- جامع الجسر الأبيض
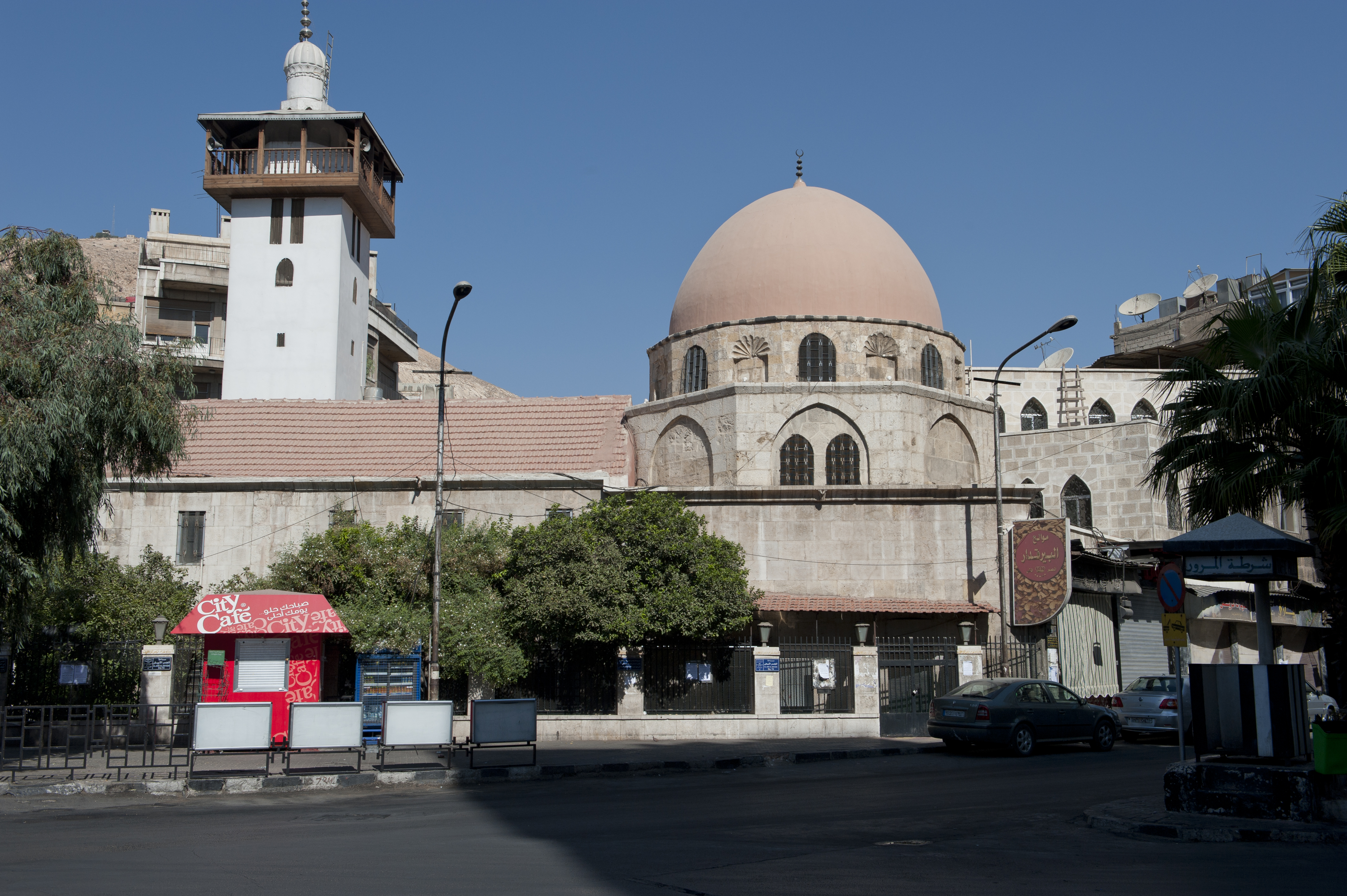

Religion
- Affiliation: Islam
- Ecclesiastical or organisational status: Mosque
- Status: Active

Location
- Location: Damascus, Damascus Governorate
- Country: Syria
- Interactive map of Al-Jisr Al-Abyad Mosque
- Coordinates: 33°31′30″N 36°17′17″E

Architecture
- Type: Mosque
- Style: Ayyubid
- Completed: 1214

Specifications
- Dome: 1
- Minaret: 1

Al-Jisr Al-Abyad Mosque (Arabic: جامع الجسر الأبيض, romanized: Jāmiʿ al-Jisr al-Abyad), formerly Al-Maridaniyya Madrasa (Arabic: المدرسة الماردانية, romanized: al-Madrasa al-Māridāniyya), is a 13th century mosque in Damascus, Syria.

== History ==
Built in 1214 CE (610 AH), during the Ayyubid era by Aziza al-Din Akhsha Khan, the wife of the Ayyubid emir Al-Mu'azzam Isa and the daughter of Emir Qutb al-Din Mawdud of Mosul. It is located 200 meters northwest of the northern ancient city-gate of Bab al-Faradis. It is located in the district of Al-Jisr Al-Abyad, in Al-Salihiyah Municipality.

== Gallery ==
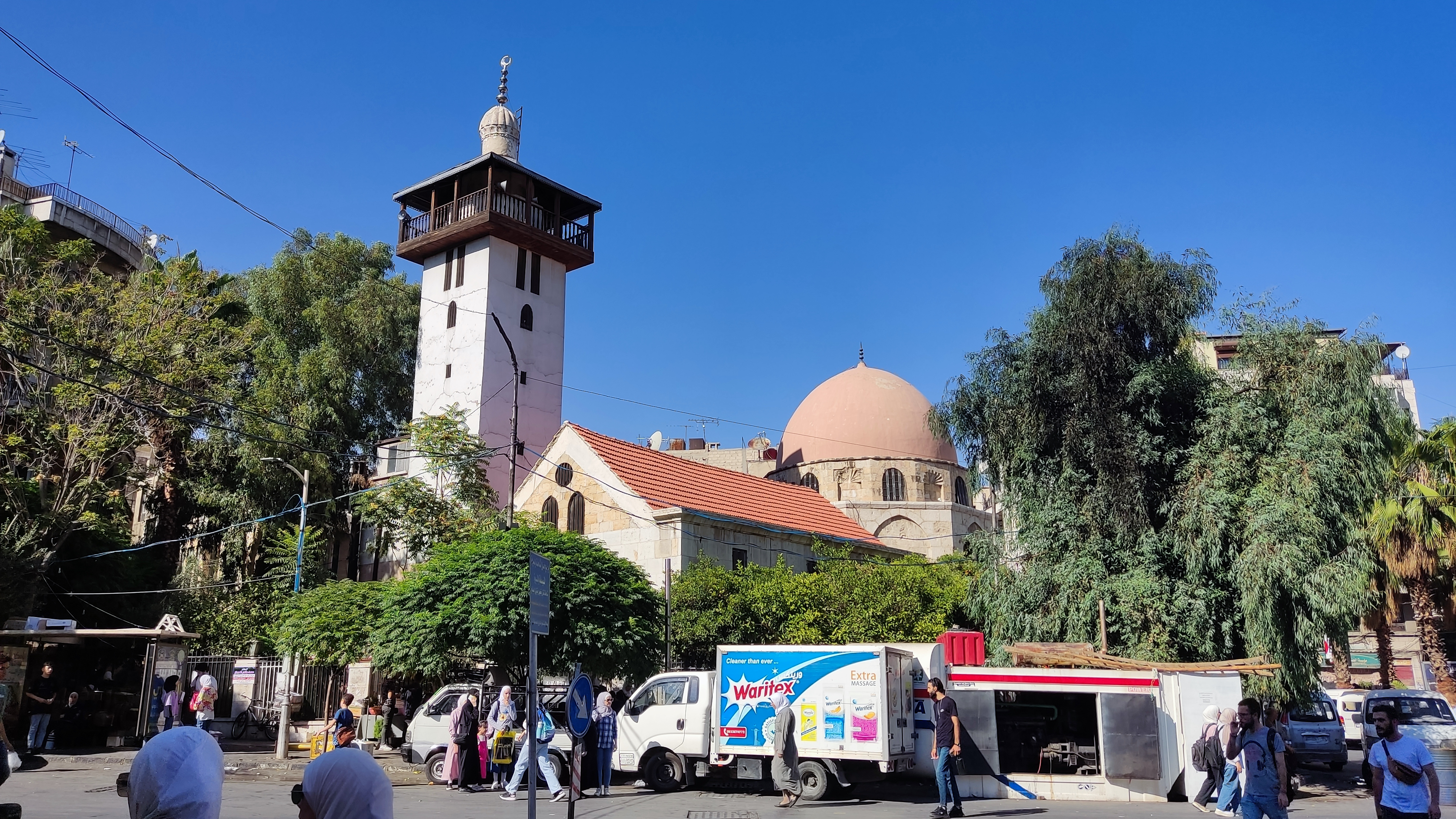

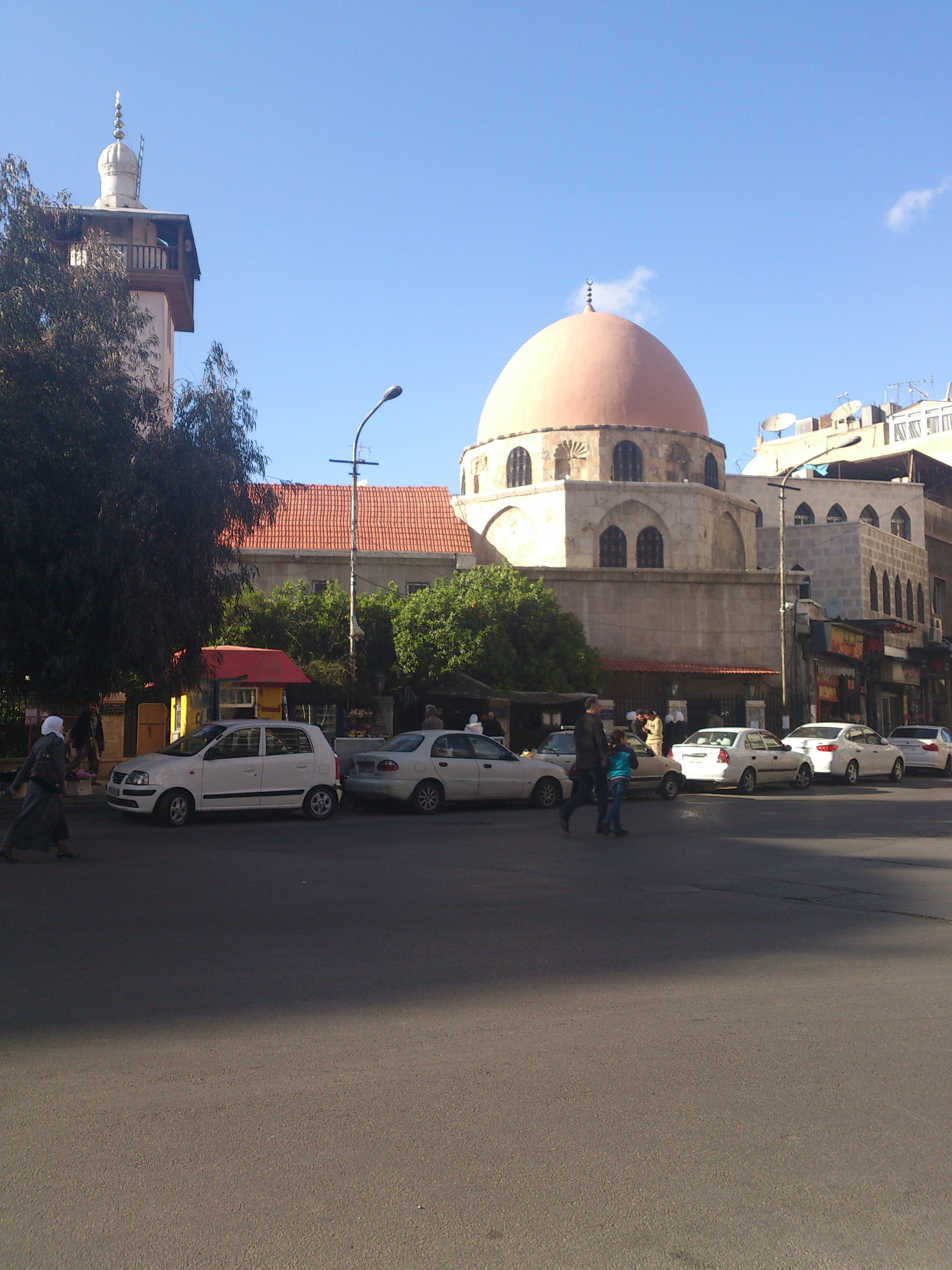

== See also ==
- Islam in Syria
- List of mosques in Damascus
