= Al-Adiliyah Madrasa =

Madrasa in Damascus, Syria

Coordinates: 33°30′44.5″N 36°18′17″E

- الْمَدْرَسَة الْعَادِلِيَّة
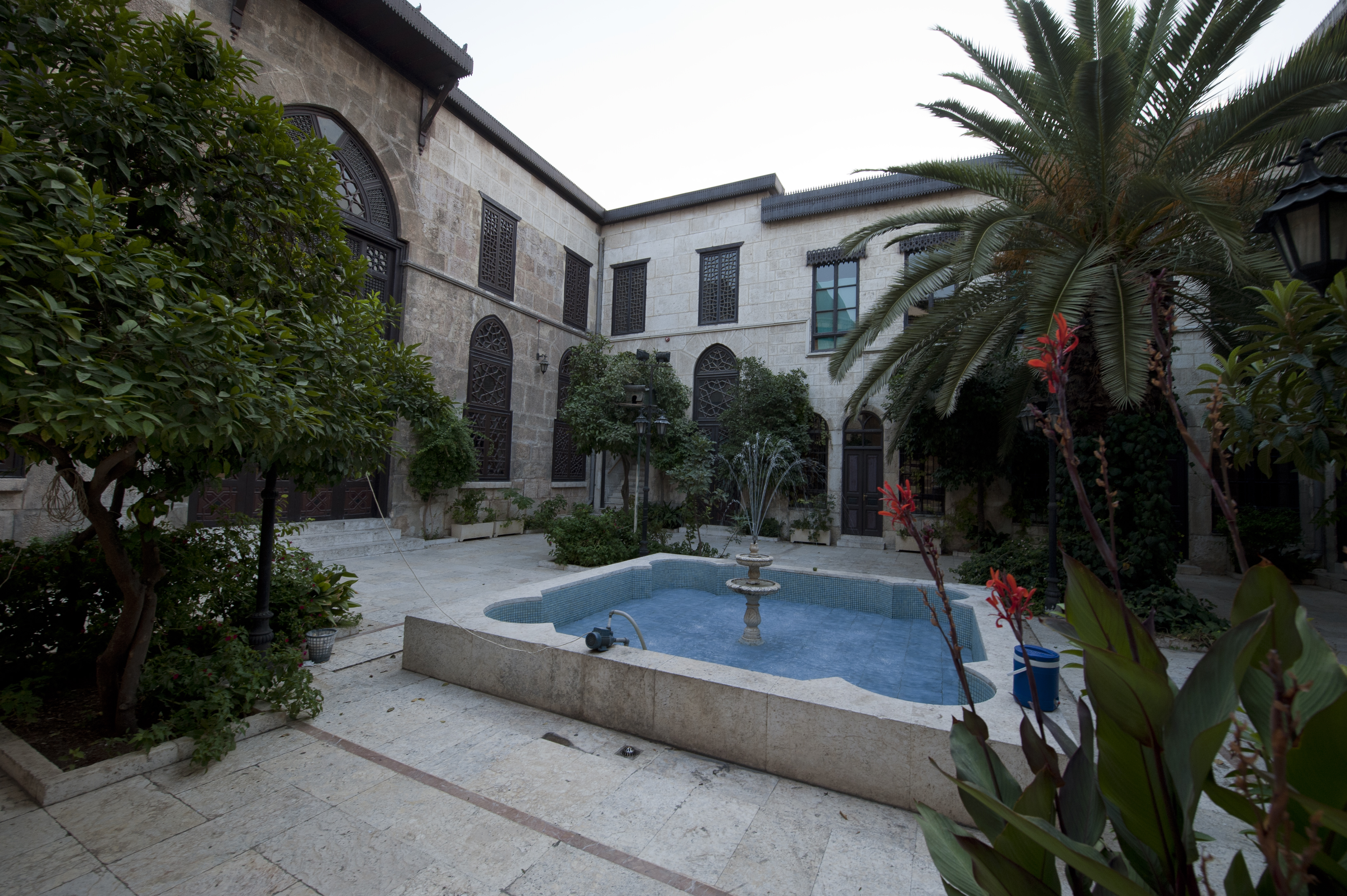
- Damascus; Syria

Information
- Type: madrasa
- Established: 1215 CE
- Founder: Al-Adil I
- Campus: Urban
- Affiliation: Islamic

Al-Adiliyah Madrasa (Arabic: الْمَدْرَسَة الْعَادِلِيَّة, romanized: al-Madrasah al-ʿĀdilīyah) is a 13th-century madrasa located in Damascus, Syria. it was founded by the Ayyubid Sultan Al-Adil I in 1215.

== Modern day ==
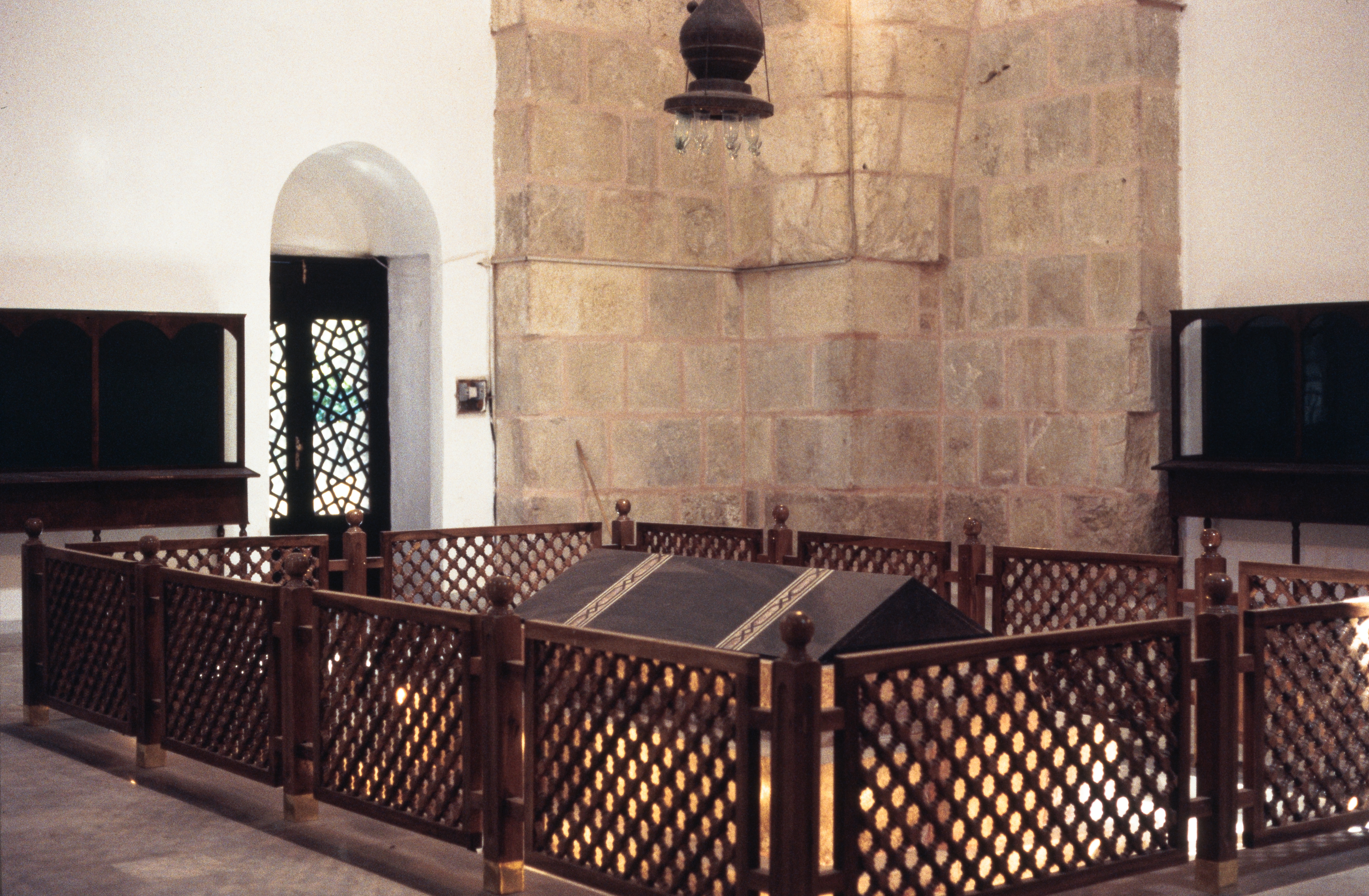
The Madrasa contains the tomb of the Ayyubid Sultan Al-Adil I (brother of Saladin)

In 1919 CE, the National Museum was assembled inside this school. It holds now the Arabic Language Academy in Damascus.

== See also ==
- Az-Zahiriyah Library
- Nur al-Din Madrasa
