= Nur al-Din Madrasa =

Islamic school in Damascus, Syria

- الْمَدْرَسَةُ النُّورِيَّة
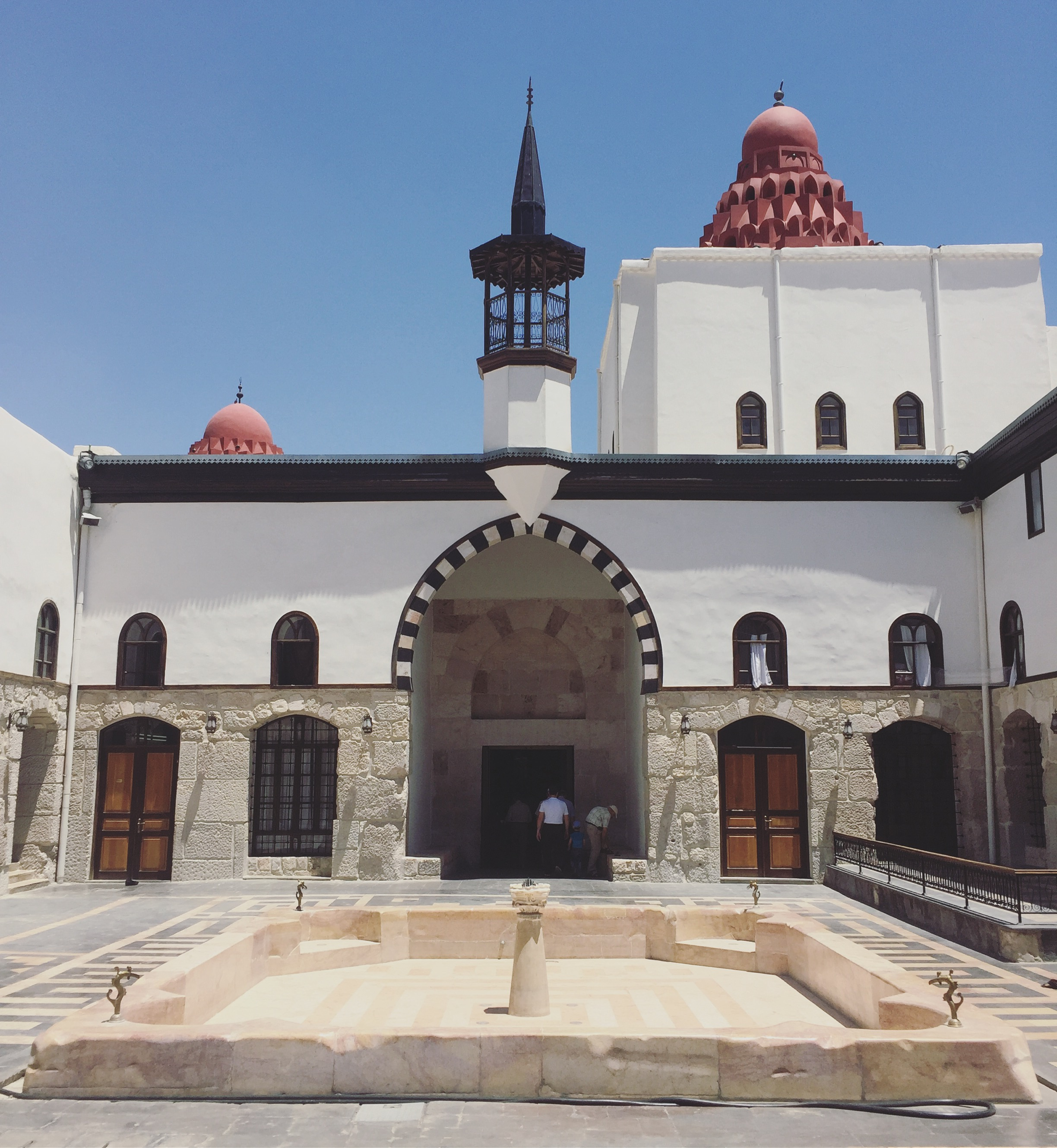
- Domes of the Nur ad-Din Madrasa

Location
- Suq al-Khayattin; Damascus; Syria

Information
- Type: Madrasa
- Established: 1167 CE
- Founder: Nur al-Din
- Campus: Urban
- Affiliation: Islamic

The Nur al-Din Madrasa (Arabic: الْمَدْرَسَةُ النُّورِيَّة, romanized: al-Madrasah an-Nūrīyah) is a funerary madrasa in Damascus, Syria. It is in the Suq al-Khayattin, inside the city walls. It was built in 1167 by Nūr ad-Dīn Zangī, atabeg of Syria, who is buried there. The complex includes a mosque, a madrasa, and the mausoleum of the founder. It was the first such complex to be built in Damascus.

The tomb-madrasa complex has two domes, first and the taller one is the oldest of the two and is over the tomb of Nur al-Din Zangi and the second, smaller muqarnas dome, similar to the dome of Nur al-Din's mausoleum belongs to the tomb of governor of Damascus Amir Djamal al-Din (d. 1269).

== Gallery ==
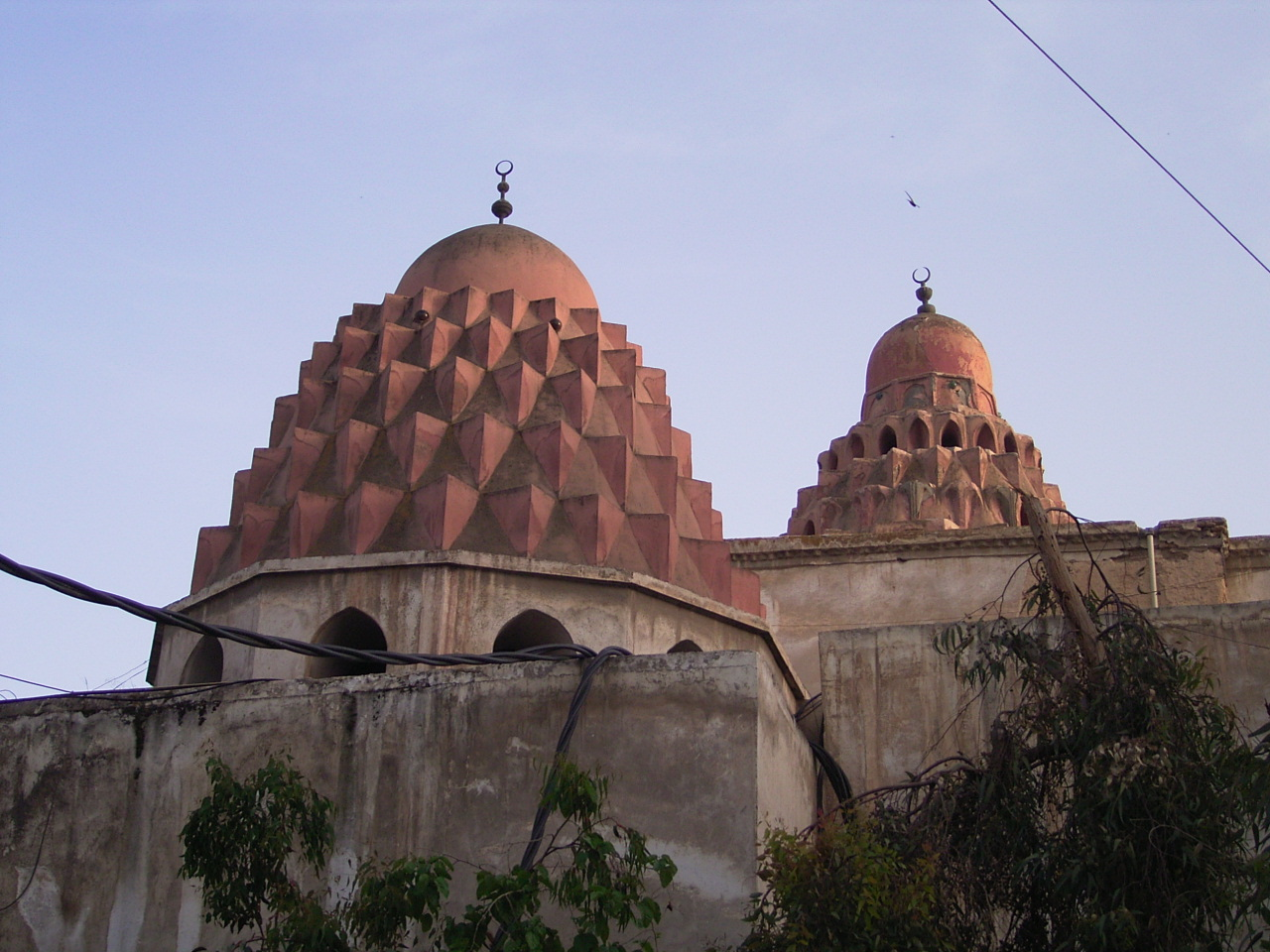
Domes of the Nur ad-Din Madrasa

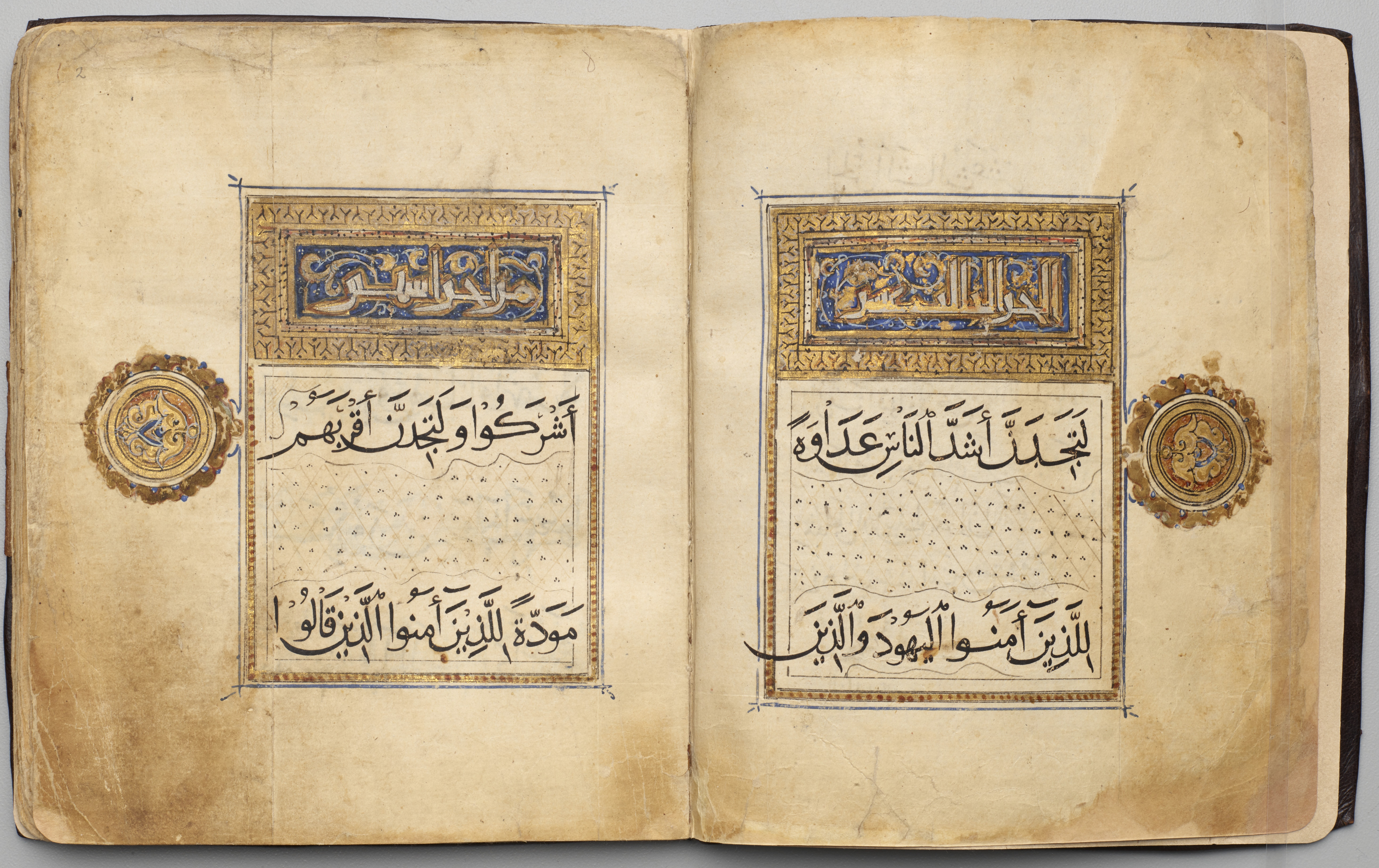
Qur'an manuscript made for Nur ad-Din and endowed to the madrasa in Damascus in 652 AH/1166–7 AD

== See also ==
- Nur al-Din Bimaristan
- Jamal al-Din al-Ghaznawi
- High medieval domes
