= Madrasa Asfouria =

Madrasa in Tunis, Tunisia

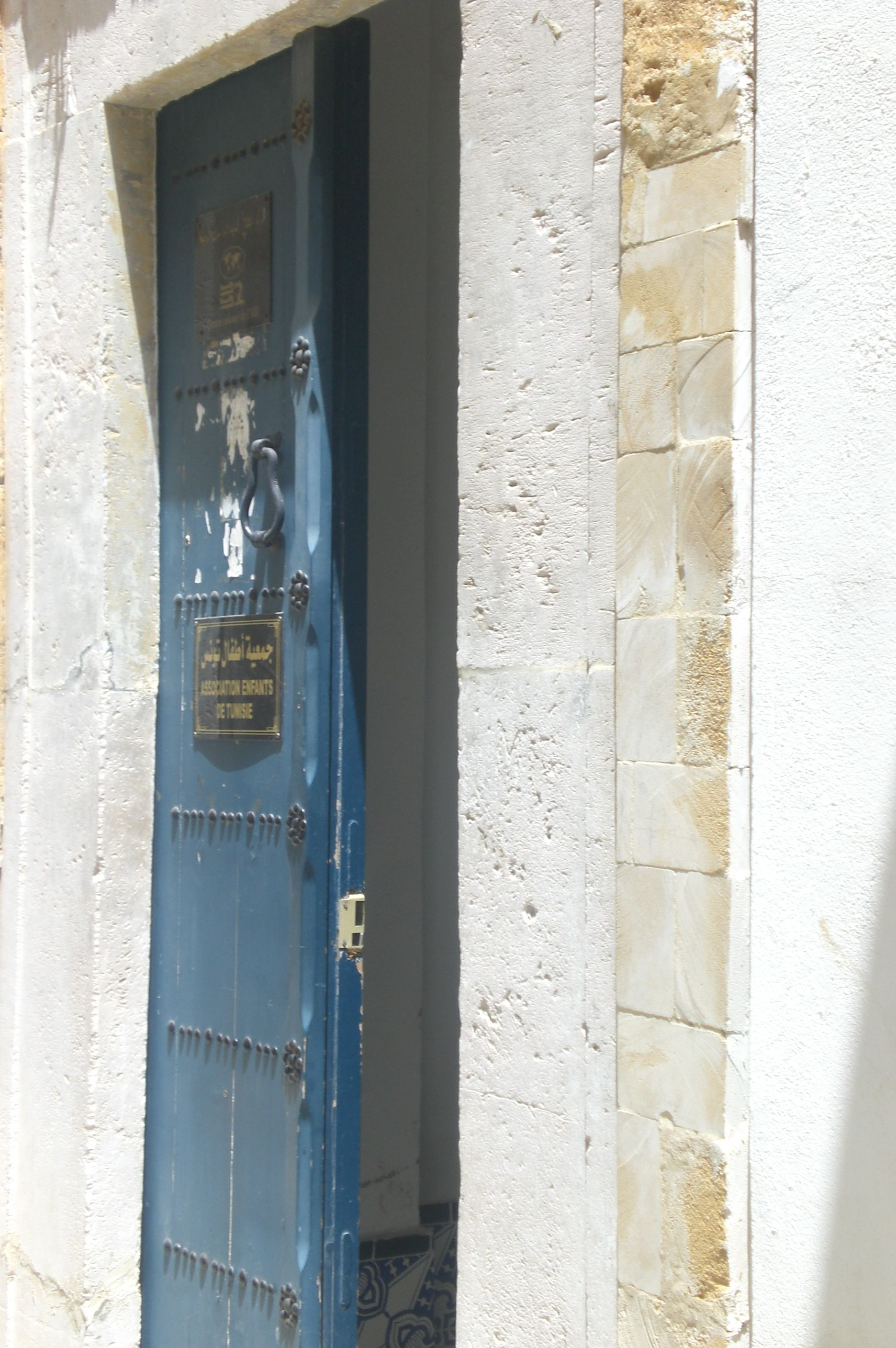
Entrance door of Madrasa Asfouria

Madrasa Asfouria (Arabic: المدرسة العصفورية) is one of the madrasahs of the medina of Tunis, which was constructed during the Hafsid era.

== Location ==
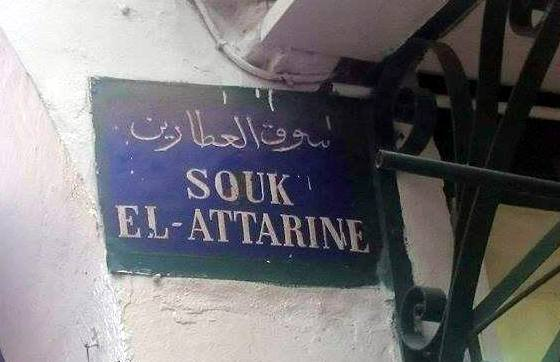
Metallic plaque indicating Souk El Attarine

The madrasa is located at an alley near Souk El Attarine, between Madrasa Al Khaldounia and Madrasa Hamzia, hence creating a complex of madrasahs.

It stands only a few meters from the Al-Zaytuna Mosque.

== History ==
It was built during the Hafsid era, at the same time as other madrasahs such as Madrasa Ech Chamaiya, Madrasa El Tawfikia, Madrasa El Mountaciriya and Madrasa El Unqiya.

It is named after the scholar Ibn Asfur El Ichbili from Seville, who taught at the madrasa.

== Scholars ==
Among its scholars, other than Ibn Asfur Ibn Ichbili, we can also name Sheikh Salah El Cherif before his departure to Damascus and the poet Muhammad Tahar Battikh.

== Evolution ==
The madrasa was restored by the Association de sauvegarde de la médina de Tunis in 2000. Nowadays, it hosts the premises of five associations including the Tunisian Association of Research and Studies on Tunisian Intellectual Heritage.

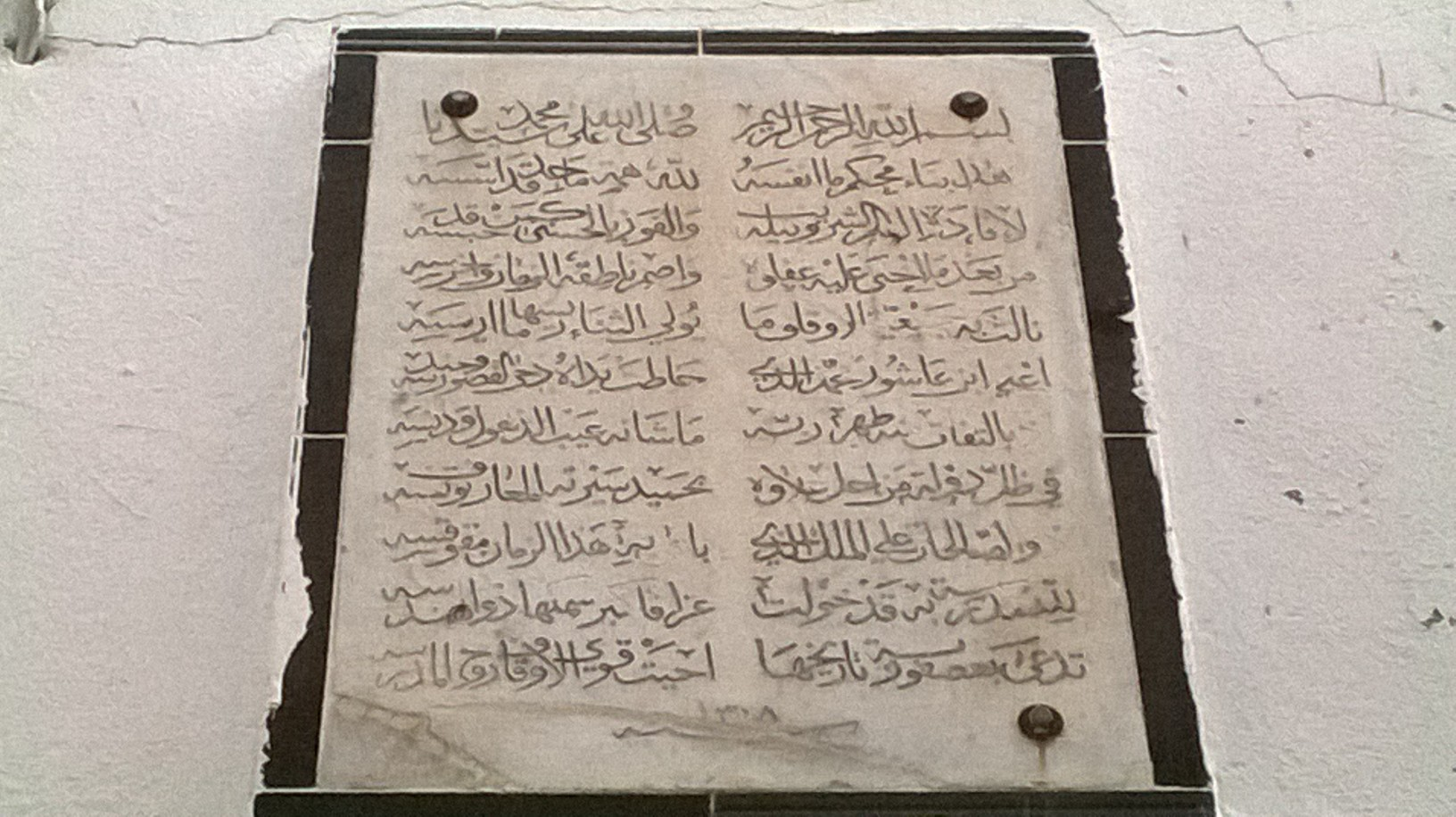
Inscription located at the entrance of the madrasa

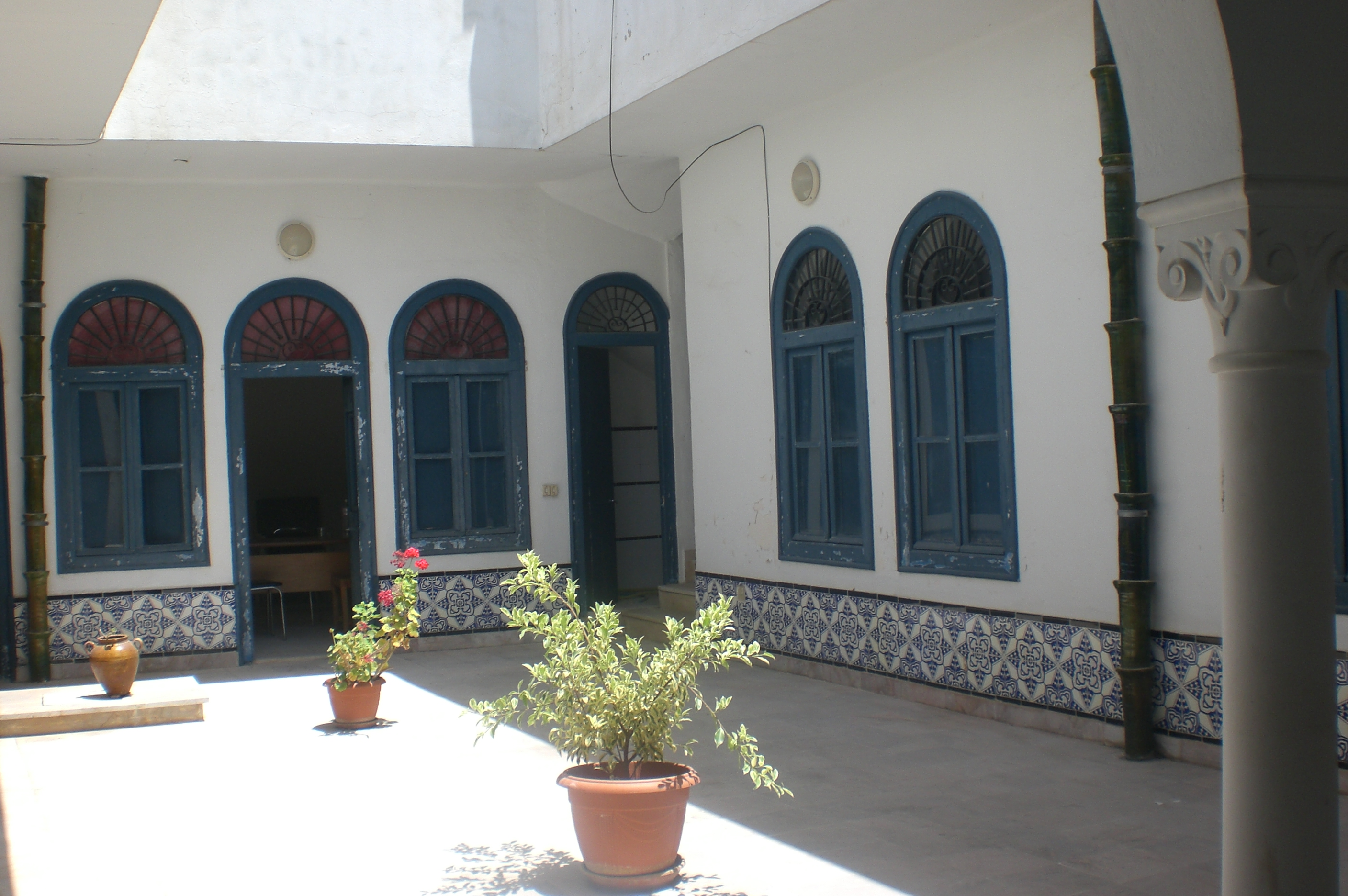
Patio of the madrasa
