= Madrasas of Tunis =

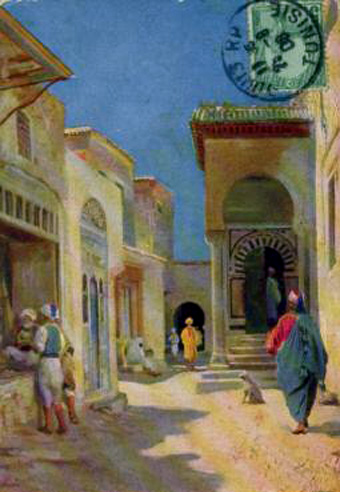
Postcard of Madrasa Slimania (18th century)

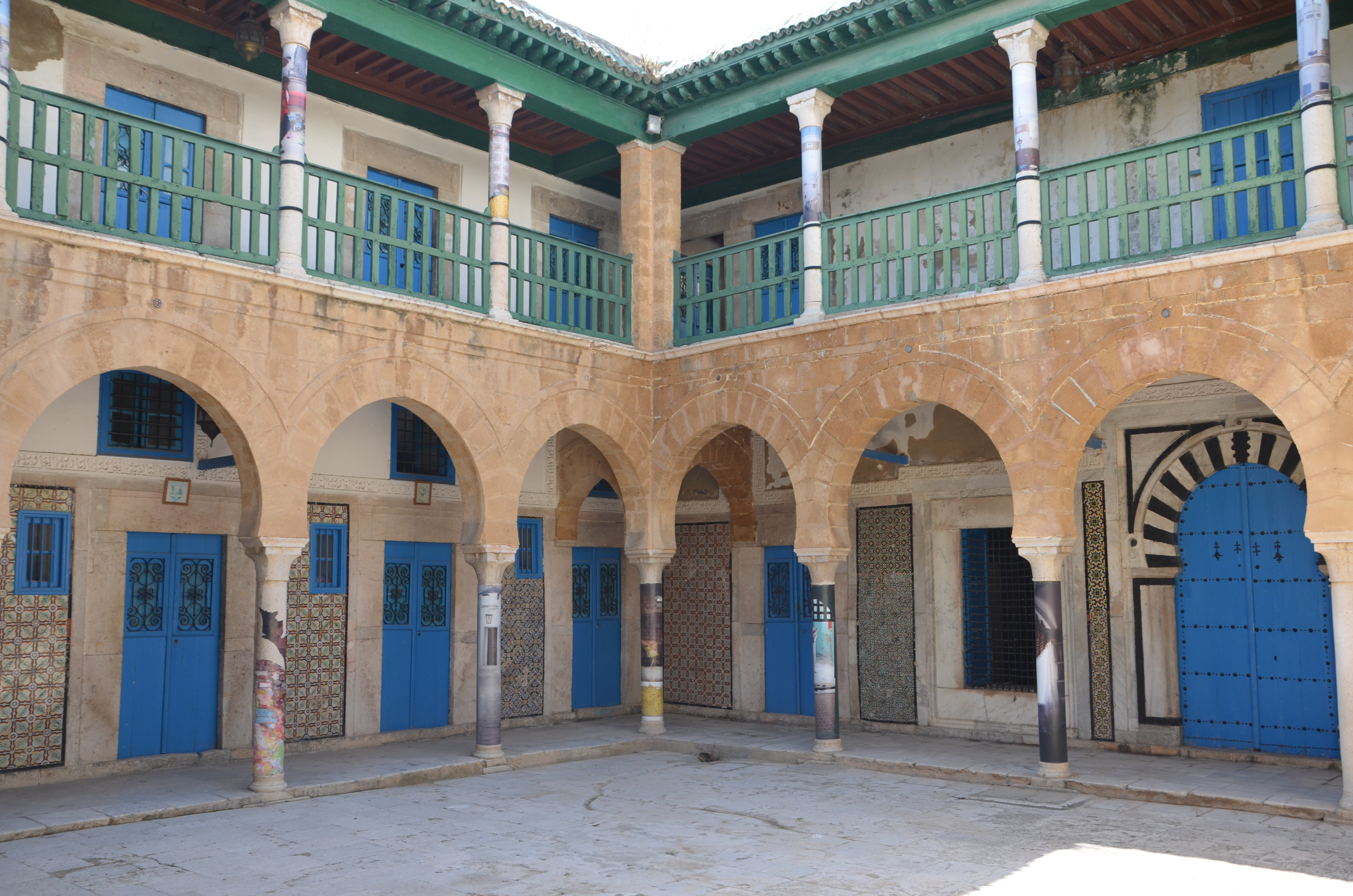
Cour médersa Mouradia

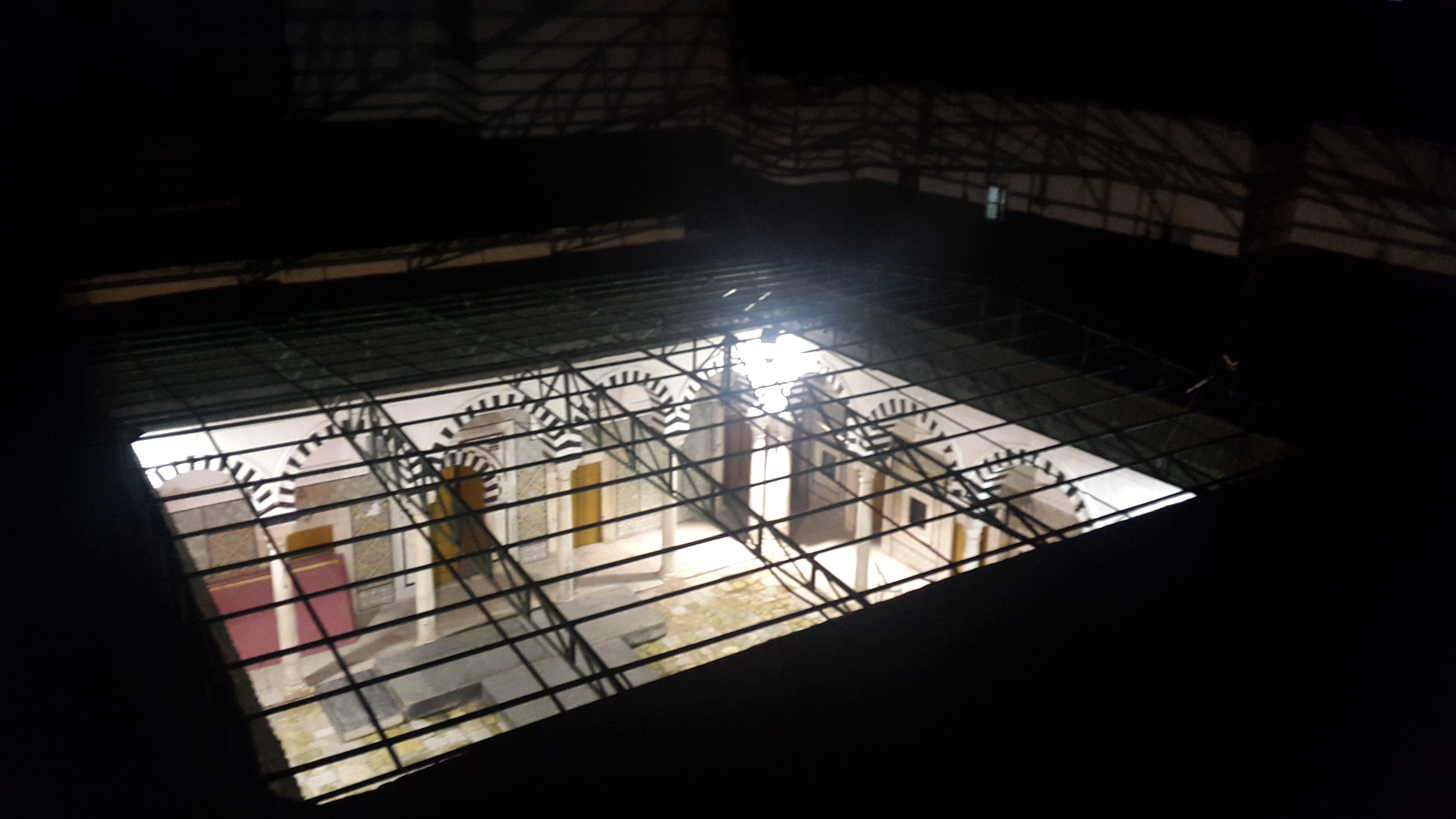
Patio de la médresa Bir Lahjar

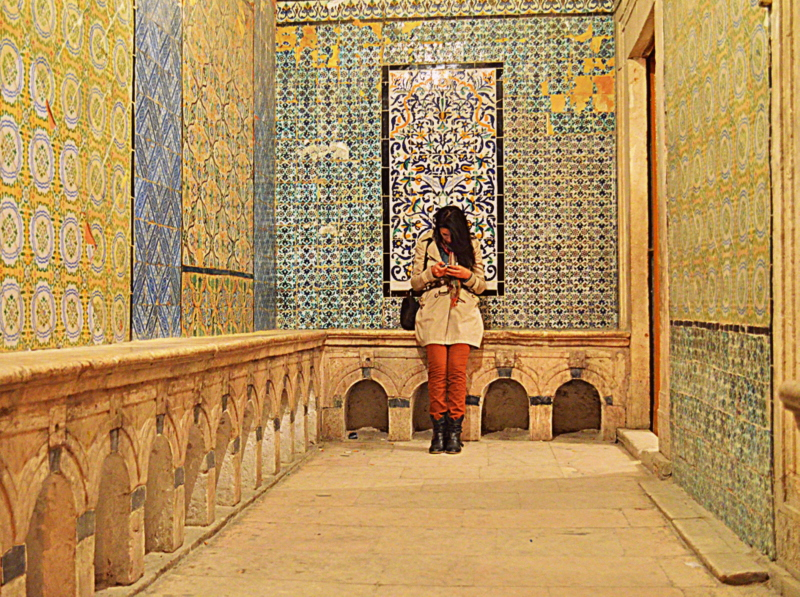
Entrée de la médresa Bir lahjar

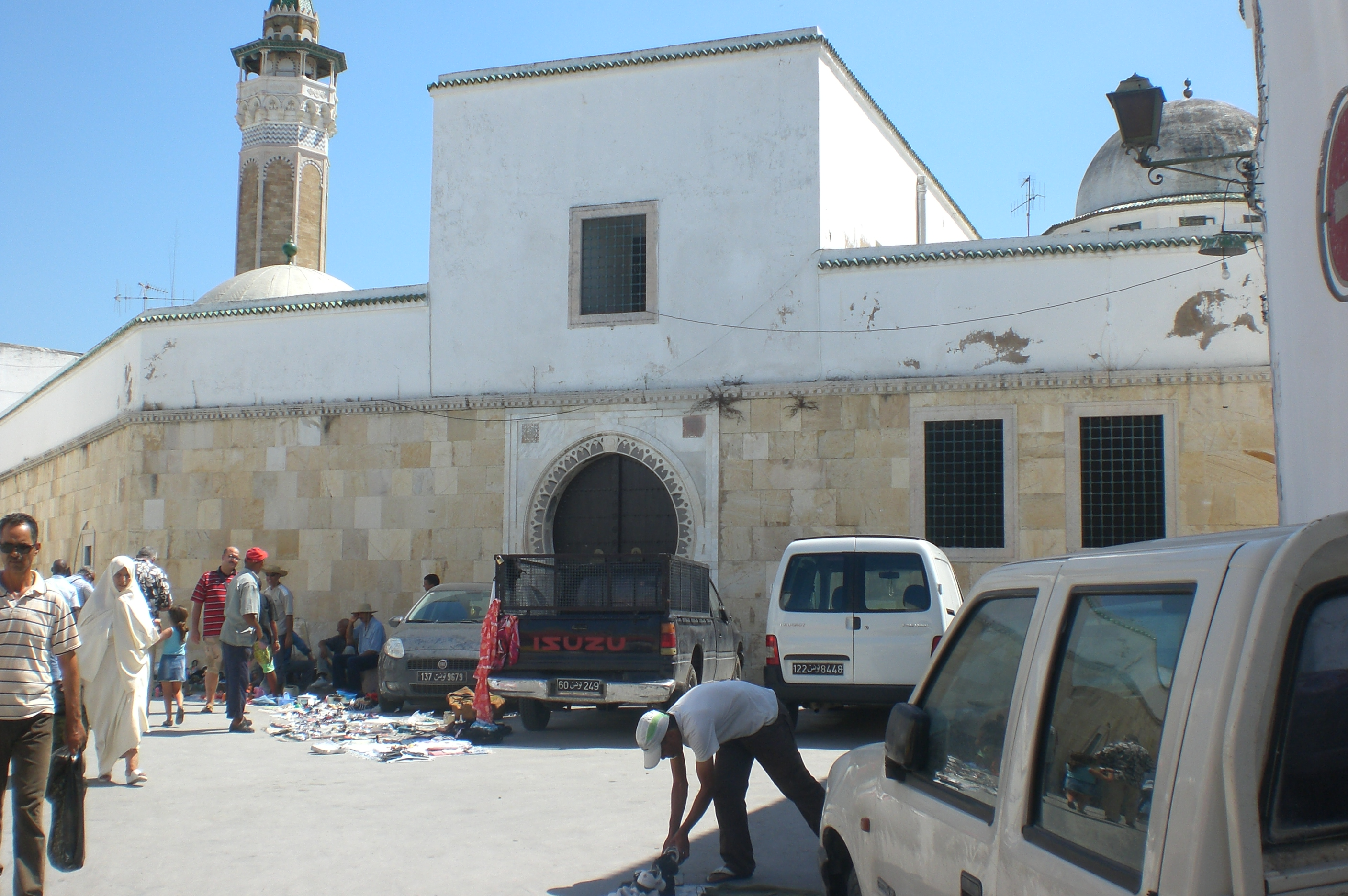
Facade of Madrasa Saheb Ettabaâ

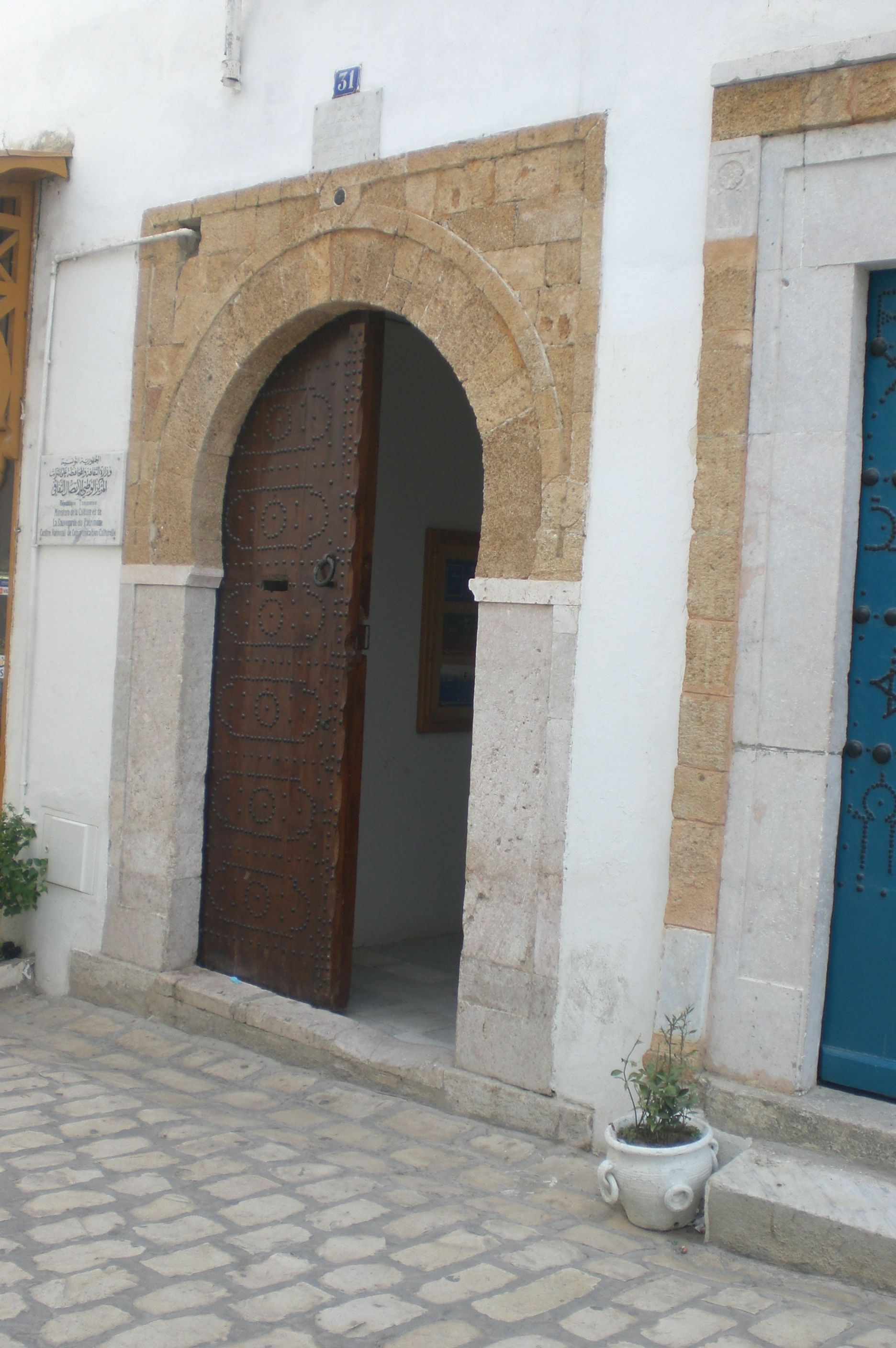
Door of Madrasa Salhia

Madrasas of Tunis were built under the reign of the Hafsid dynasty in the medina of Tunis. They were founded to teach Almohad doctrine, but beginning on the 14th century, taught mostly Malakite doctrine.

In the 1850s and 1860s, teaching, living, and learning in the madrases was difficult, described as "poorly lighted little rooms and crowded conditions, must have been picturesque."

The original plan in the late 19th century was that those schools would contribute to educating the state civil servants. In the 20th and 21st centuries, their role is limited to hosting students of the University of Ez-Zitouna, or other institutions.

Only in the 1980s were the history and architecture of the madrasas the subjects of independent scholarship.

== List ==
- Madrasa Al Habibia Al Kubra
- Madrasa Al Habibia Al Sughra
- Madrasa Al Husseiniya Al Kubra
- Madrasa Al Husseiniya Al Sughra
- Madrasa Al Jassoussia
- Madrasa Al Khaldounia
- Madrasa Asfouria
- Madrasa Andaloussiya
- Madrasa Ibn Tafargine
- Madrasa Bir Lahjar
- Madrasa El Jemaa Al Jedid
- Madrasa Ech Chamaiya
- Madrasa El Achouria
- Madrasa El Bachia
- Madrasa El Maghribia
- Madrasa El Mountaciriya
- Madrasa El Mtaychia
- Madrasa El Tawfikia
- Madrasa El Unqiya
- Madrasa El Yusefiya
- Madrasa Ennakhla
- Madrasa Hamzia
- Madrasa Marjania - built between 1293 and 1299 by Abu Mohamed Abdullah Al Morjani, located in the northern part of the medina, near Bab el Khadra gate.

Salem Bouhageb, a friend of the Grand Vizier Hayreddin Pasha, was one of the important teachers.

- Madrasa Mouradiyya - built between 1666 and 1675 during the reign of Murad II Bey of the Muradid dynasty in order to teach the Malikite doctrine. The main purpose was to make the muradid family get closer to the malikite elite.
- Madrasa Salhia
- Madrasa Slimania
- Madrasa Saheb Ettabaâ - built with the Saheb Ettabaâ Mosque during the Husainid era following the orders of Youssef Saheb Ettabaa. It accommodated 71 students. After Tunisian independence, a part of the madrasa became the office of a Neo Destour club.
