= Madrasa Sidi Ali Chiha =

Madrasa in Tunis, Tunisia

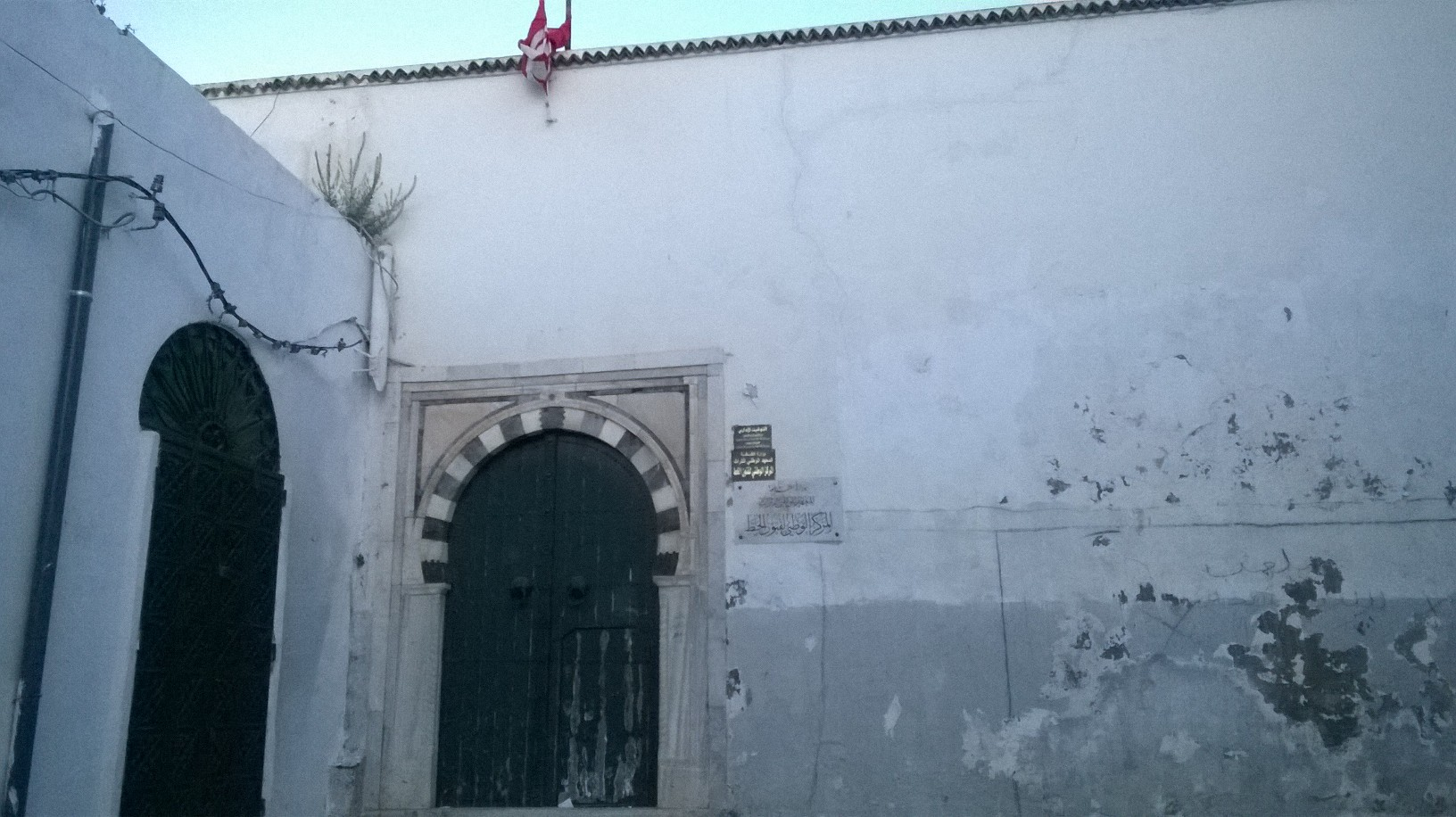
Entrance of the madrasa

The madrasa of Sidi Ali Chiha (Arabic: مدرسة سيدي علي شيحة) is one of the madrasas of the medina of Tunis attached to a zaouïa and built during the reign of Sadok Bey.

== Etymology ==
It takes its name from the saint Sidi Ali Chiha, sheikh of the Aïssawa brotherhood, died in 1854.

== Location ==
It is located on rue du Salut, in the El Halfaouine district, at the northern suburb of the medina of Tunis. It is only a few meters away from the Saheb Ettabaa Madrasah.

== History ==
It was built in 1852 by the Husainid minister Mustapha Khaznadar, who had huge respect for the spiritual leader of the Aïssawas brotherhood.

== Evolution ==
This monument, completely restored in 1995, housed for years the National Calligraphy Center1.
