= Souk Sidi Sridek =

Coordinates: 36.801278°N 10.170803°E

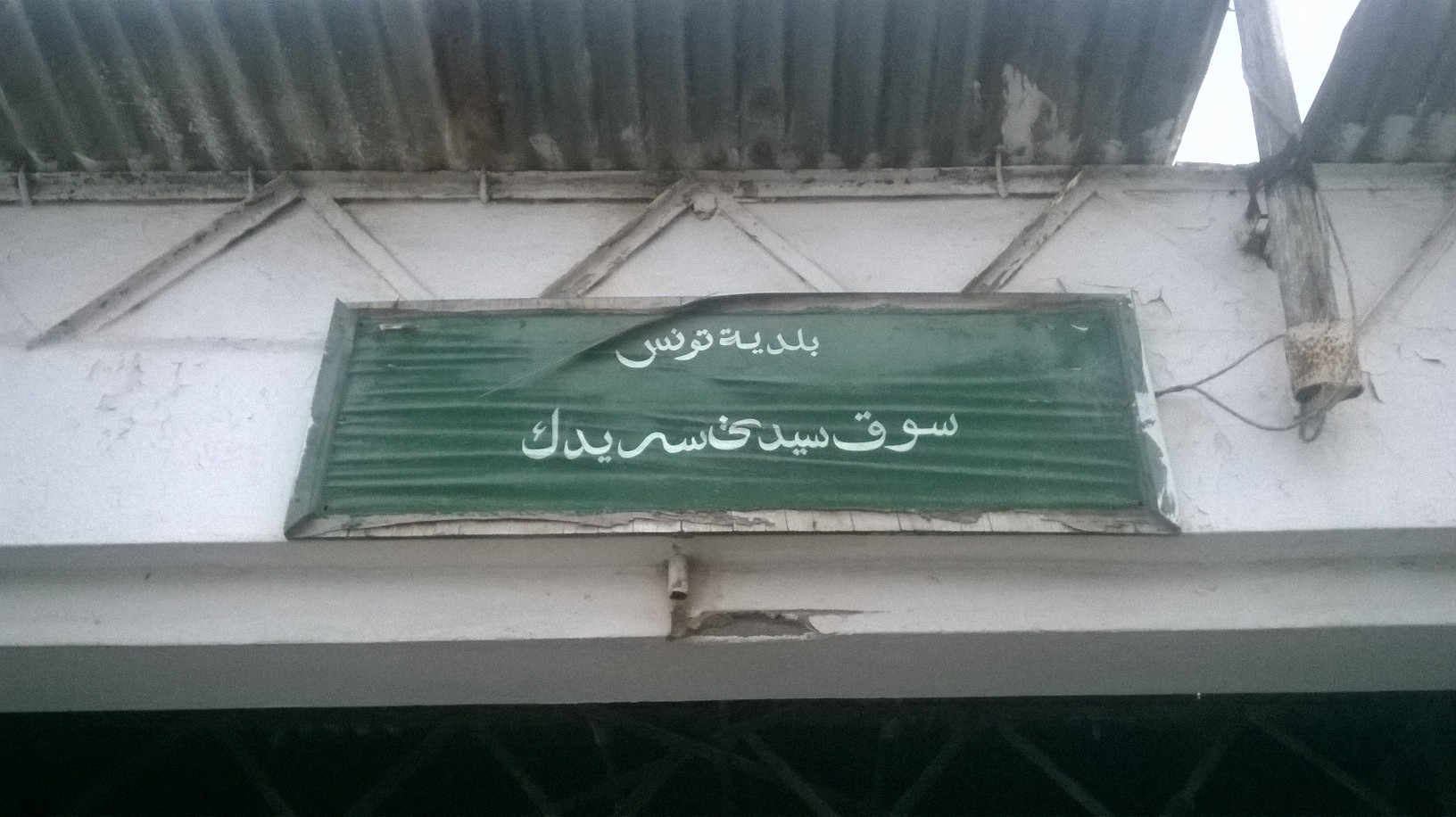
Metallic sign indicating souk Sidi Sridek

Souk Sidi Sridek (Arabic: سوق سيدي سريدك) is one of the popular souks of the medina of Tunis. It is specialized in selling daily use products.

== Location ==
It is located in Sidi Sridek Street in the Hafsia District in the north-east of Al-Zaytuna Mosque.

== History ==
The souk was founded by Ahmad II in 1940 during the french occupation. It got refurbished in 2010 under the orders of the mayor of Tunis.

== Monuments ==
It is situated near the Jewish hood where the madrasa El Achouria and Achour Mosque are located.

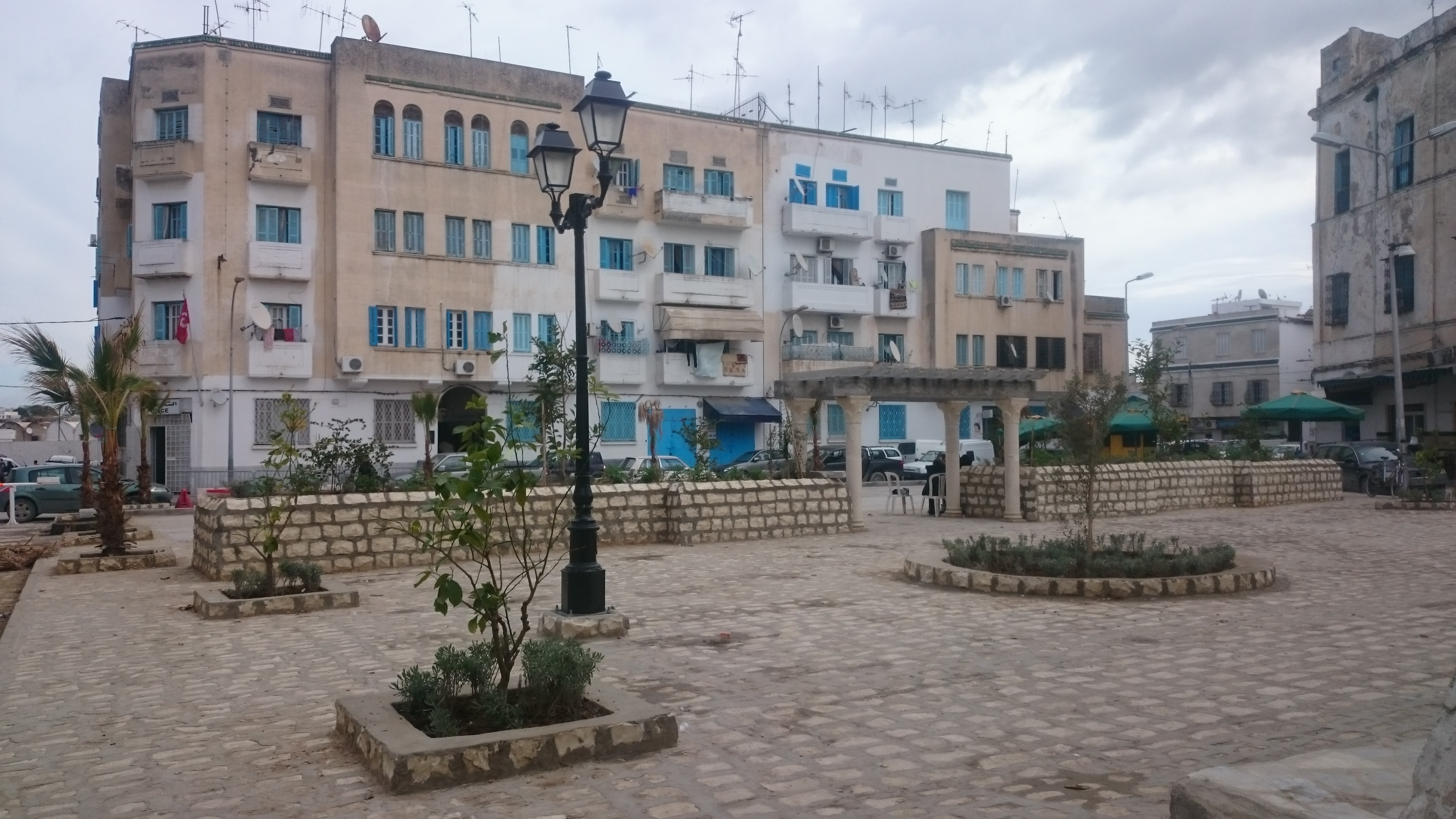
El Hara or the jewish hood in 2016

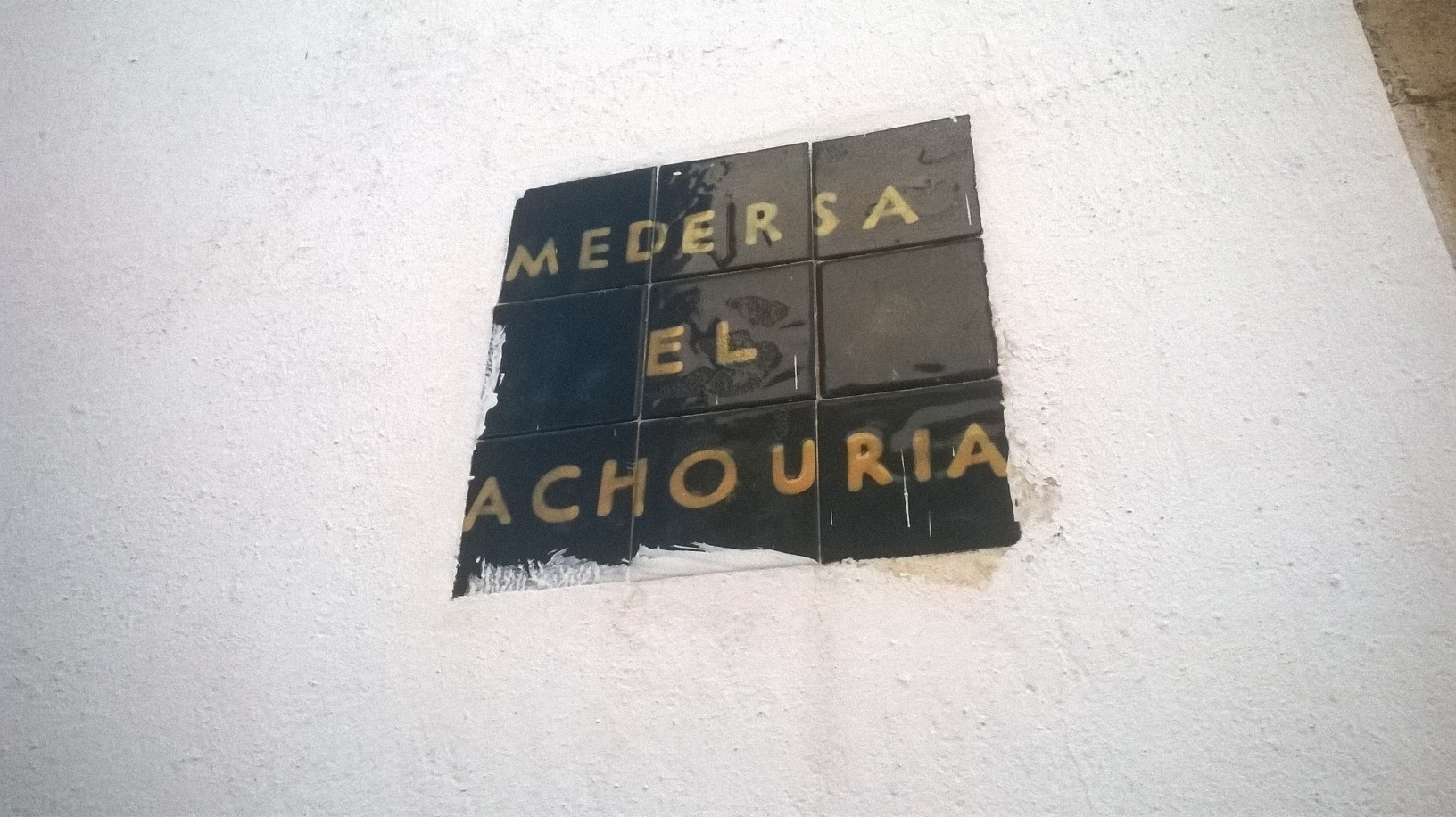
Madrasa El Achouria's sign

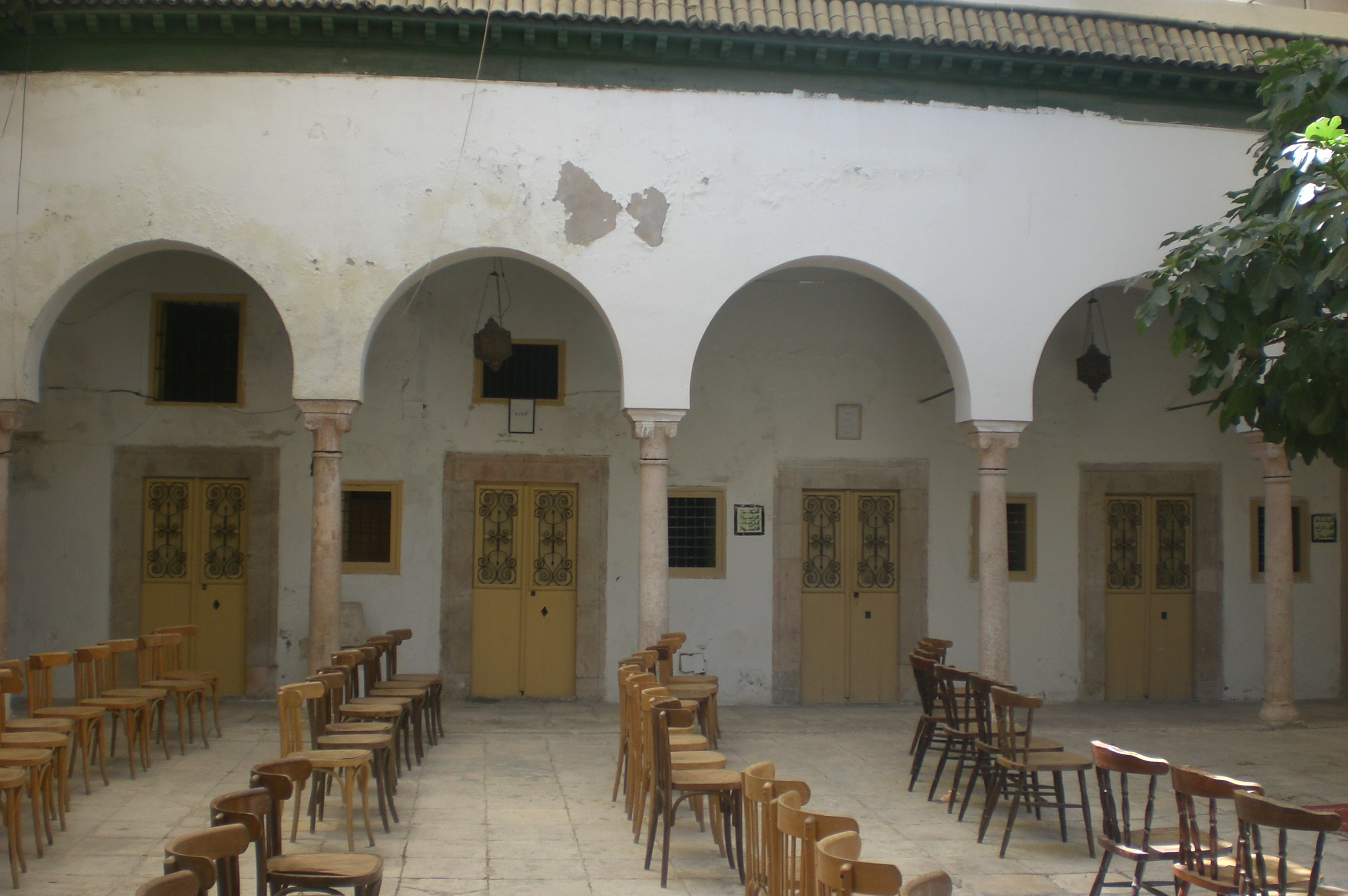
Hall of the madrasa El Achouria

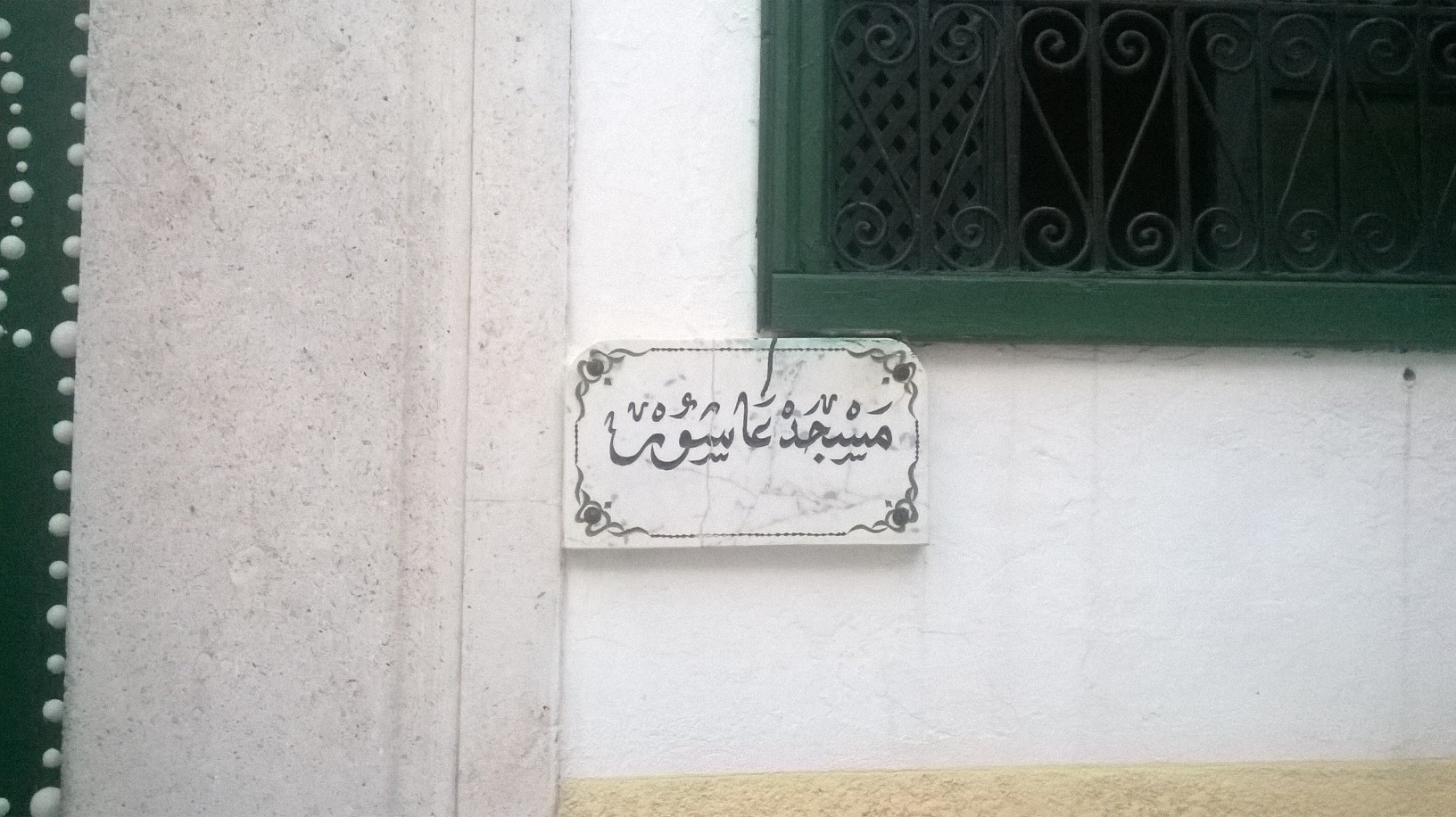
Marble sign of Achour Mosque

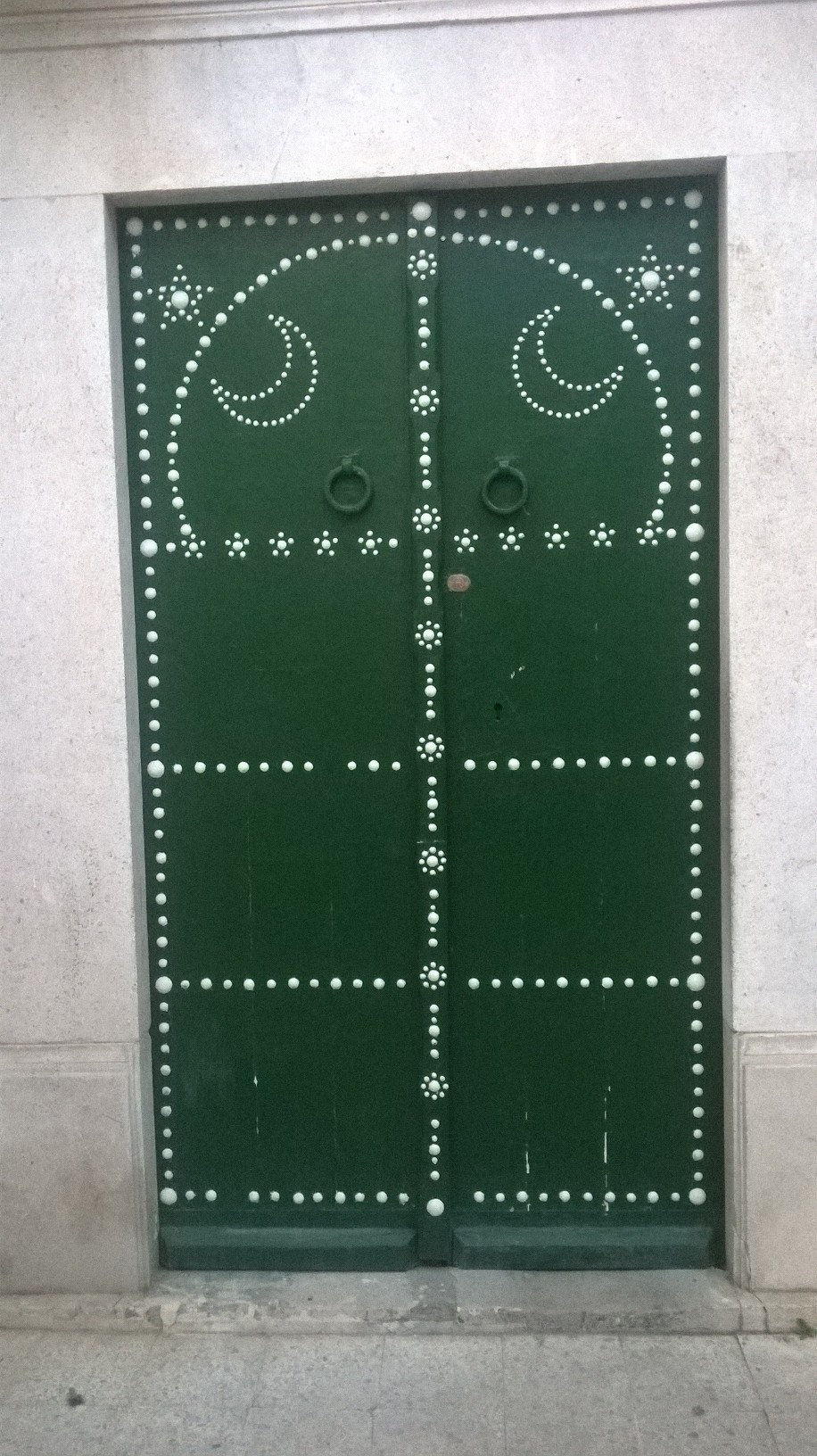
Entrance of Achour mosque

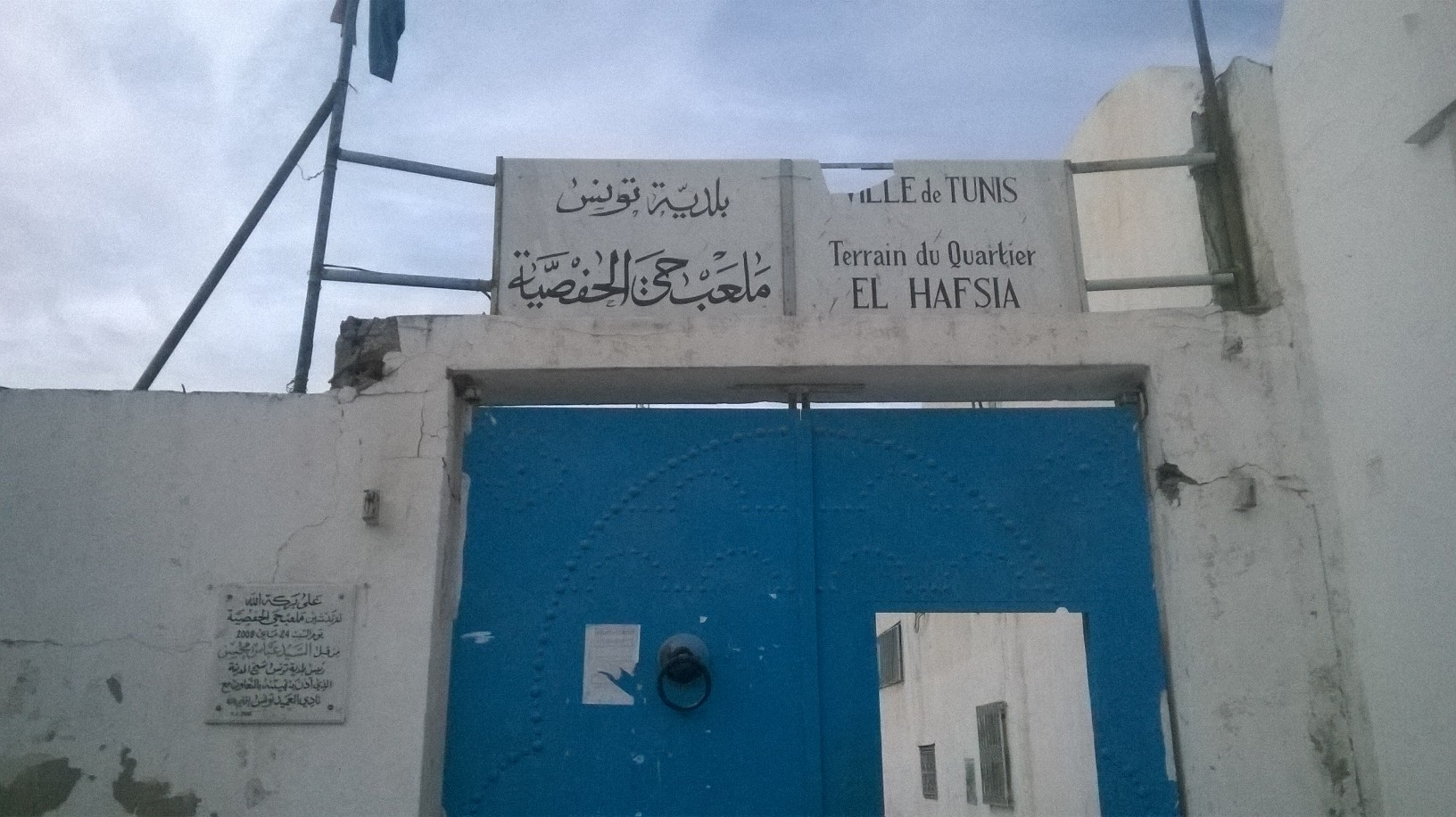
Field of Hafsia District
