= Abi Mohamed Al Morjani Mosque =

Mosque in Tunis, Tunisia

- جامع أبي محمد المرجاني
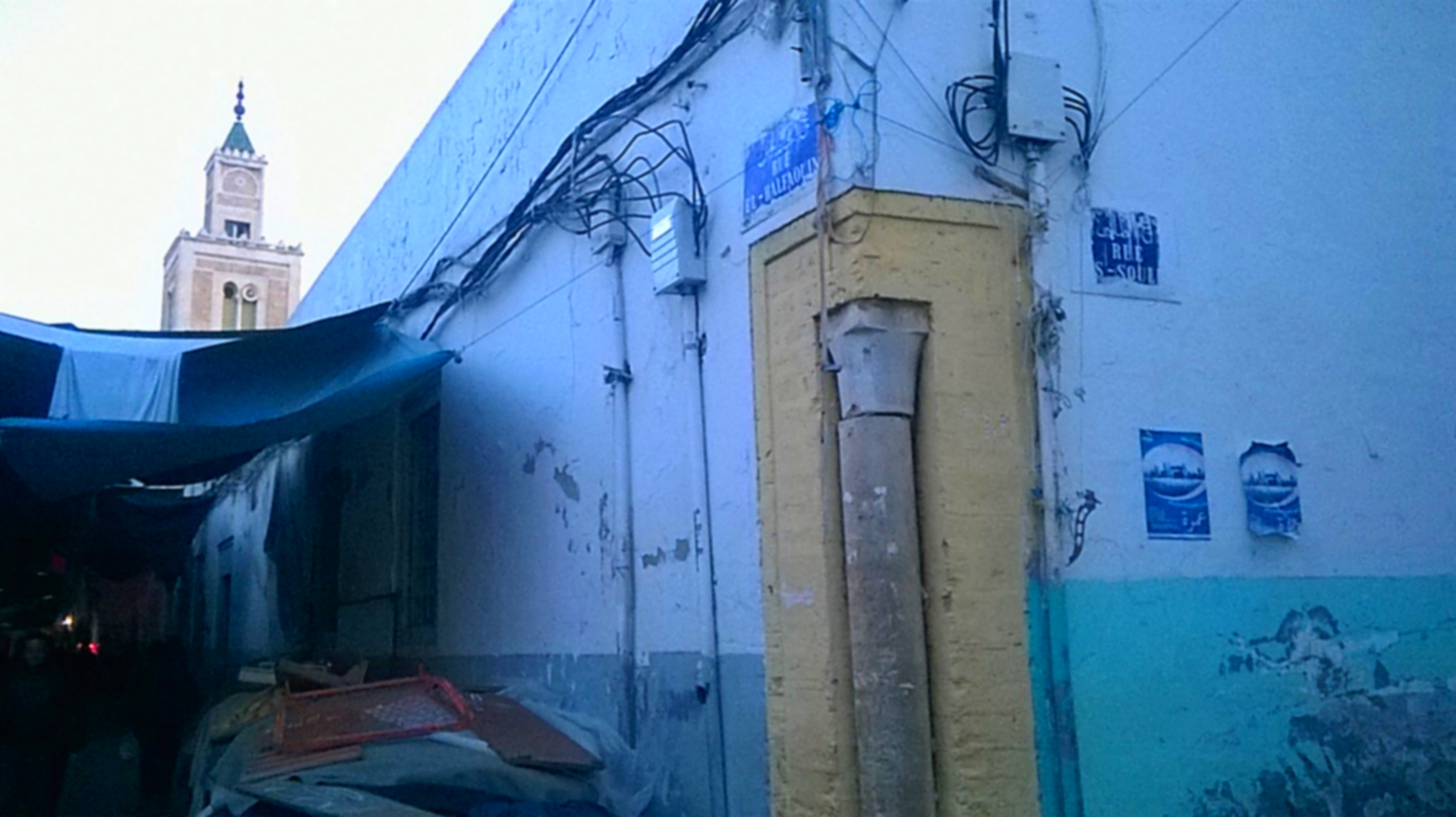

- Location within Tunisia

Religion
- Affiliation: Islam
- Branch/tradition: Sunni

Location
- Location: Tunis, Tunisia
- Coordinates: 36.805816111111°N 10.167803611111°E

Architecture
- Type: Mosque

Abi Mohamed Al Morjani Mosque (Arabic: جامع أبي محمد المرجاني) is a small mosque in the Halfaouine hood, in the north of the Medina of Tunis.

== Localization ==
It is located in 33 El Halfaouine Street.

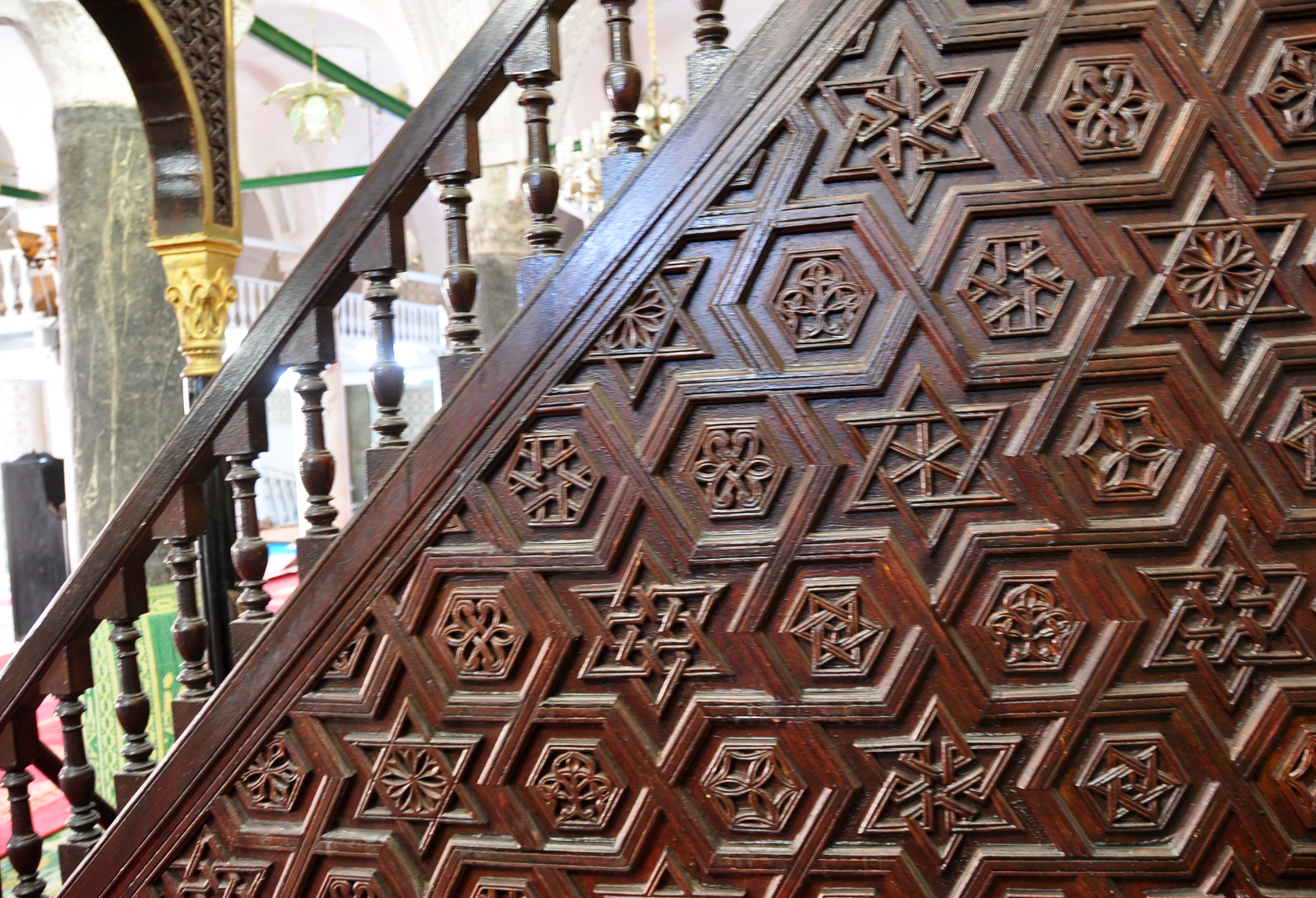
Minbar of the mosque

== Etymology ==
The madrasa Marjania and the mosque got their names from their founder, the sheikh Abou Mohamed Al Morjani (Arabic: أبو محمد المرجاني), a close friend of the saint Abul Hasan ash-Shadhili.

== History ==
According to the commemorative plaque at the entrance, it was built in the 13th century. It is known for its minbar that was made in 1493 and where the chahada is engraved. The mosque was restored between 1963 and 1966.

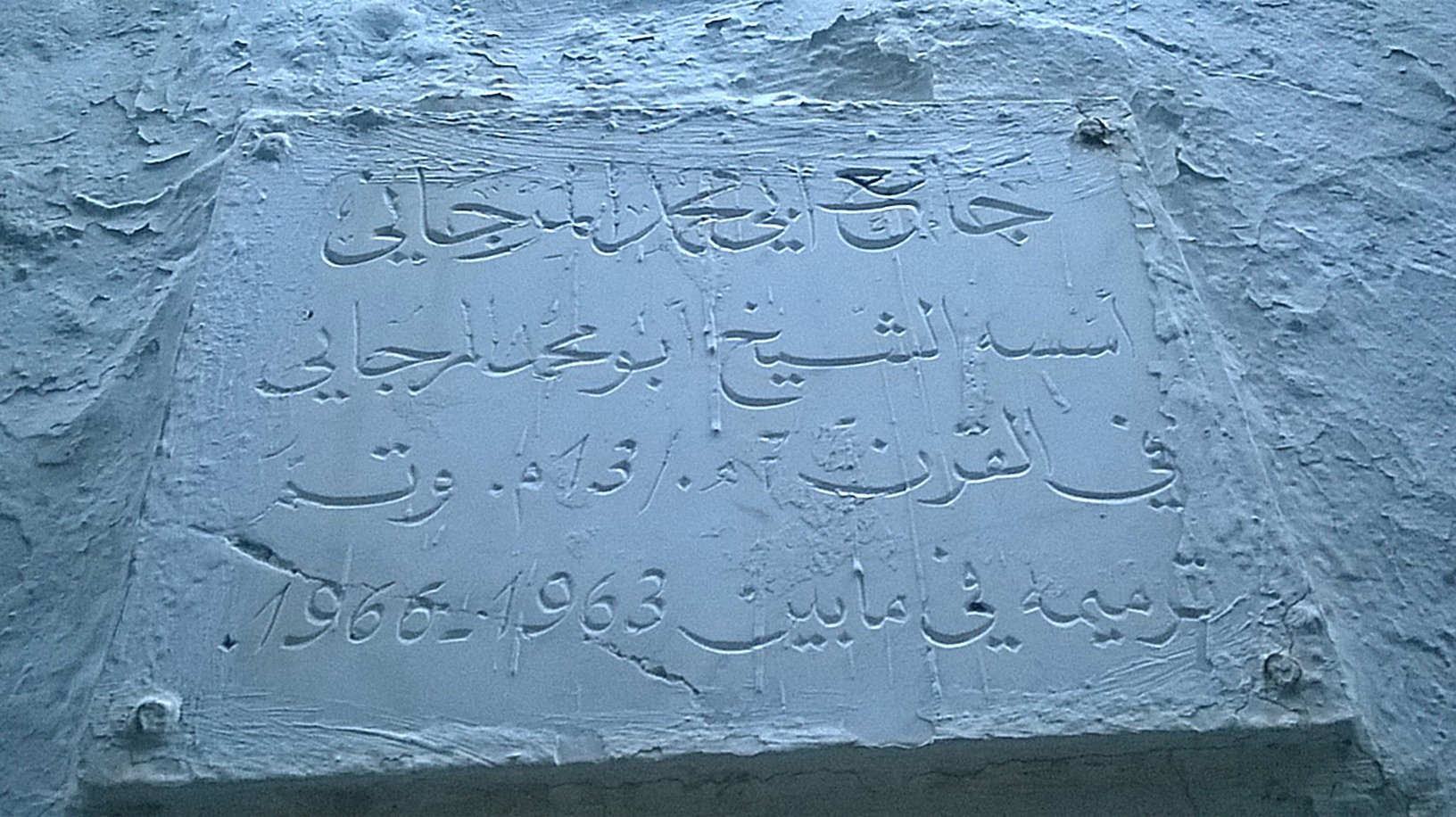
Commemorative plaque of the mosque

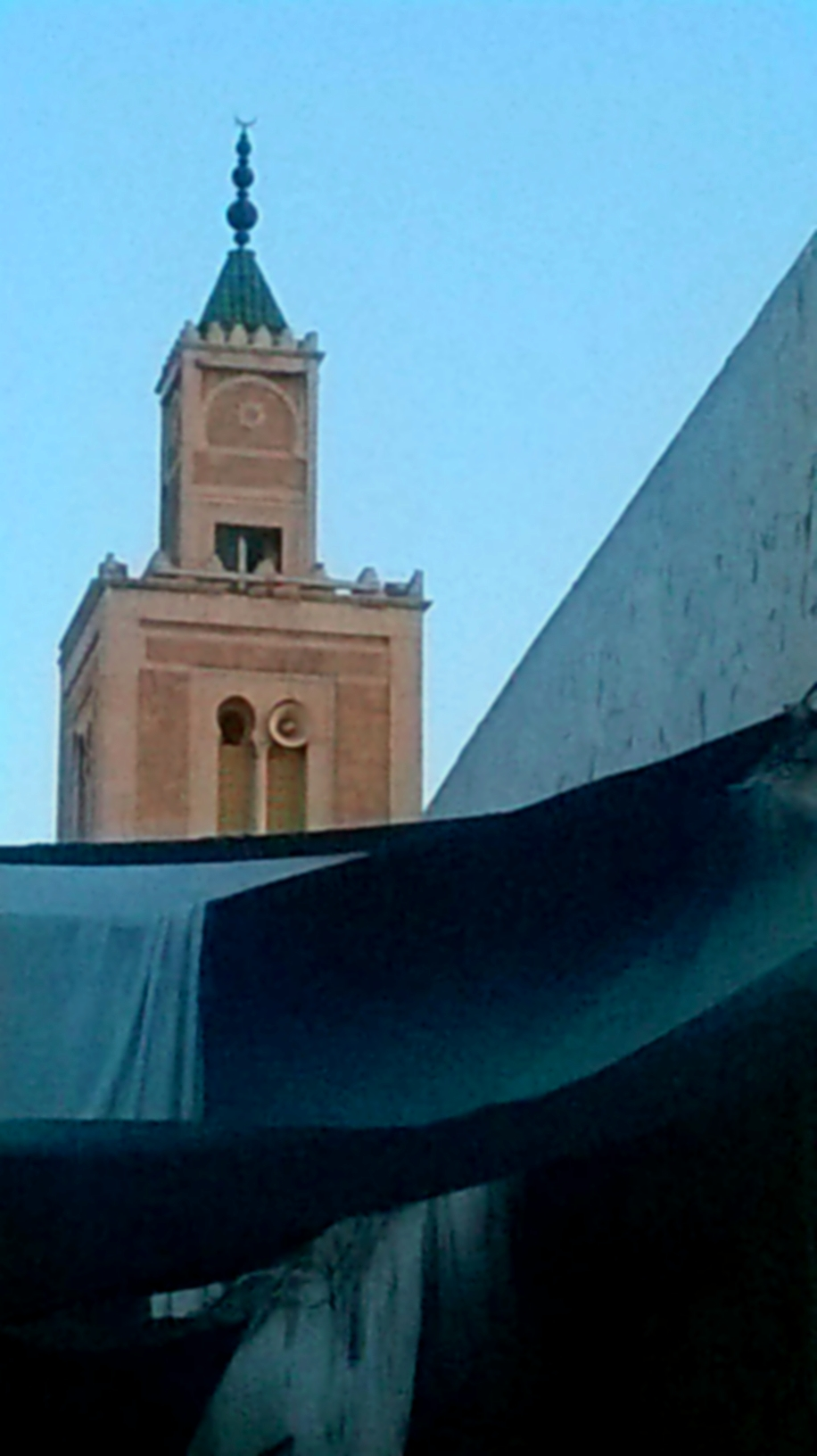
Minaret of the mosque

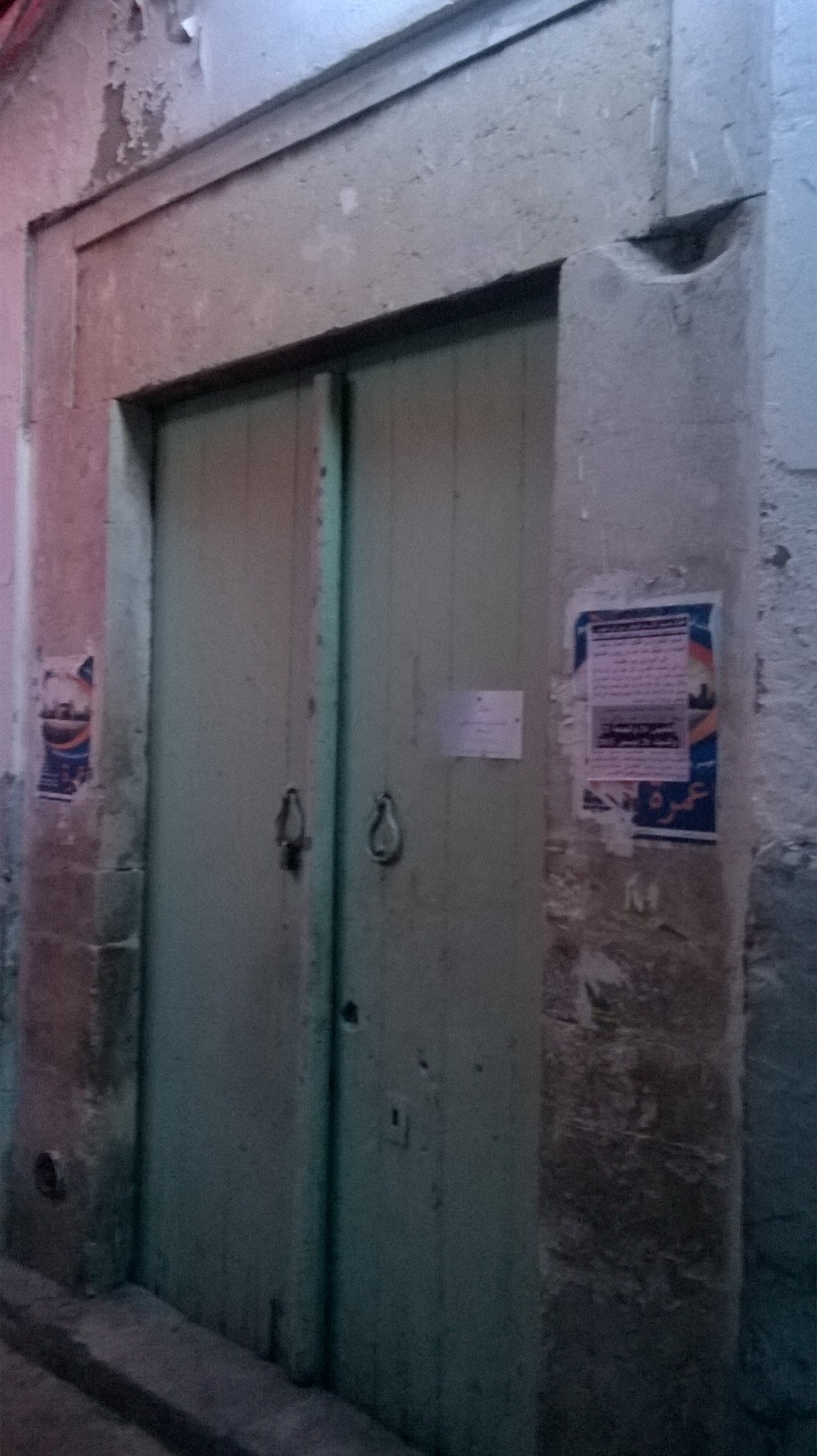
Entrance of the mosque

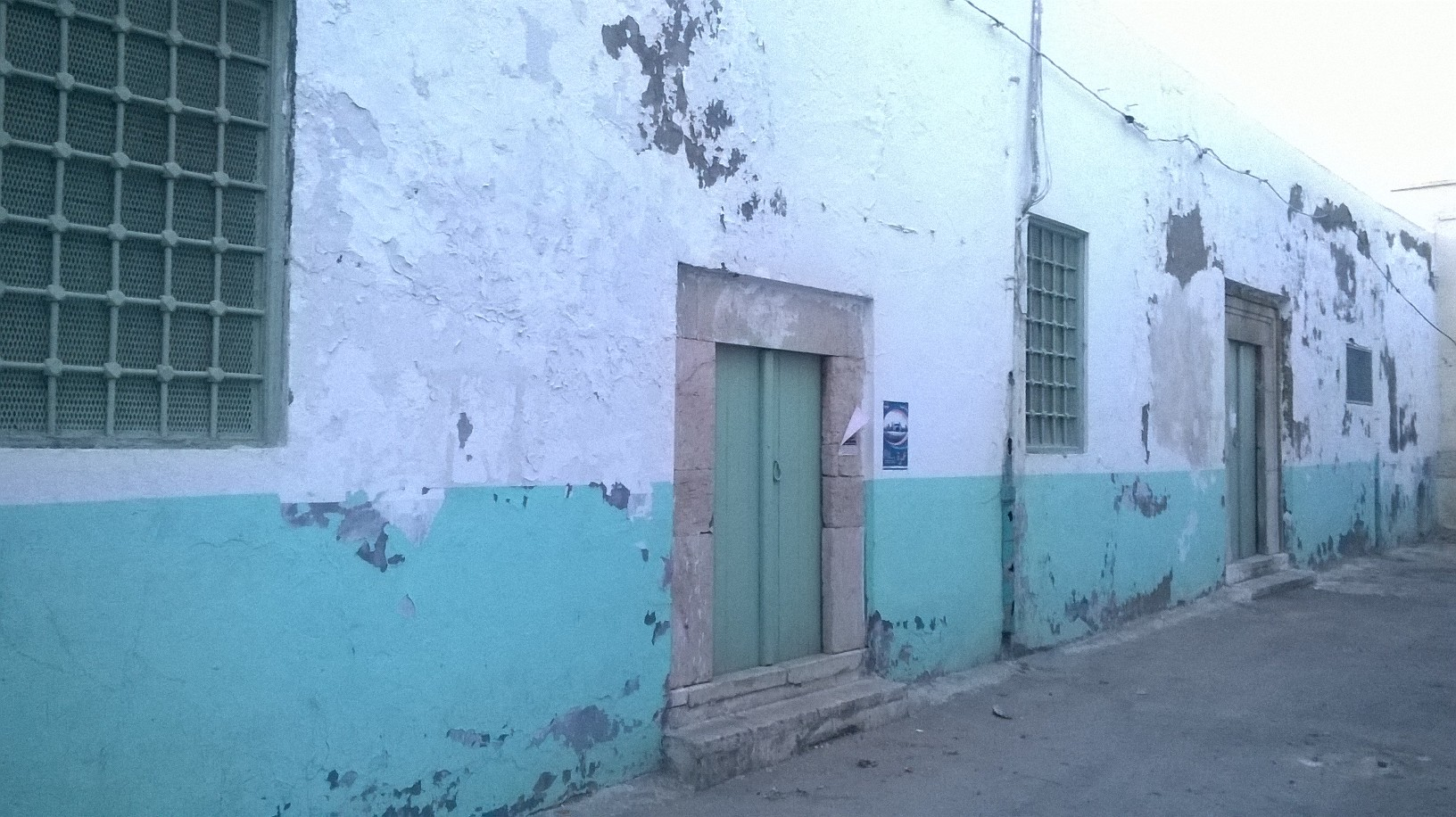
Arches of the mosque

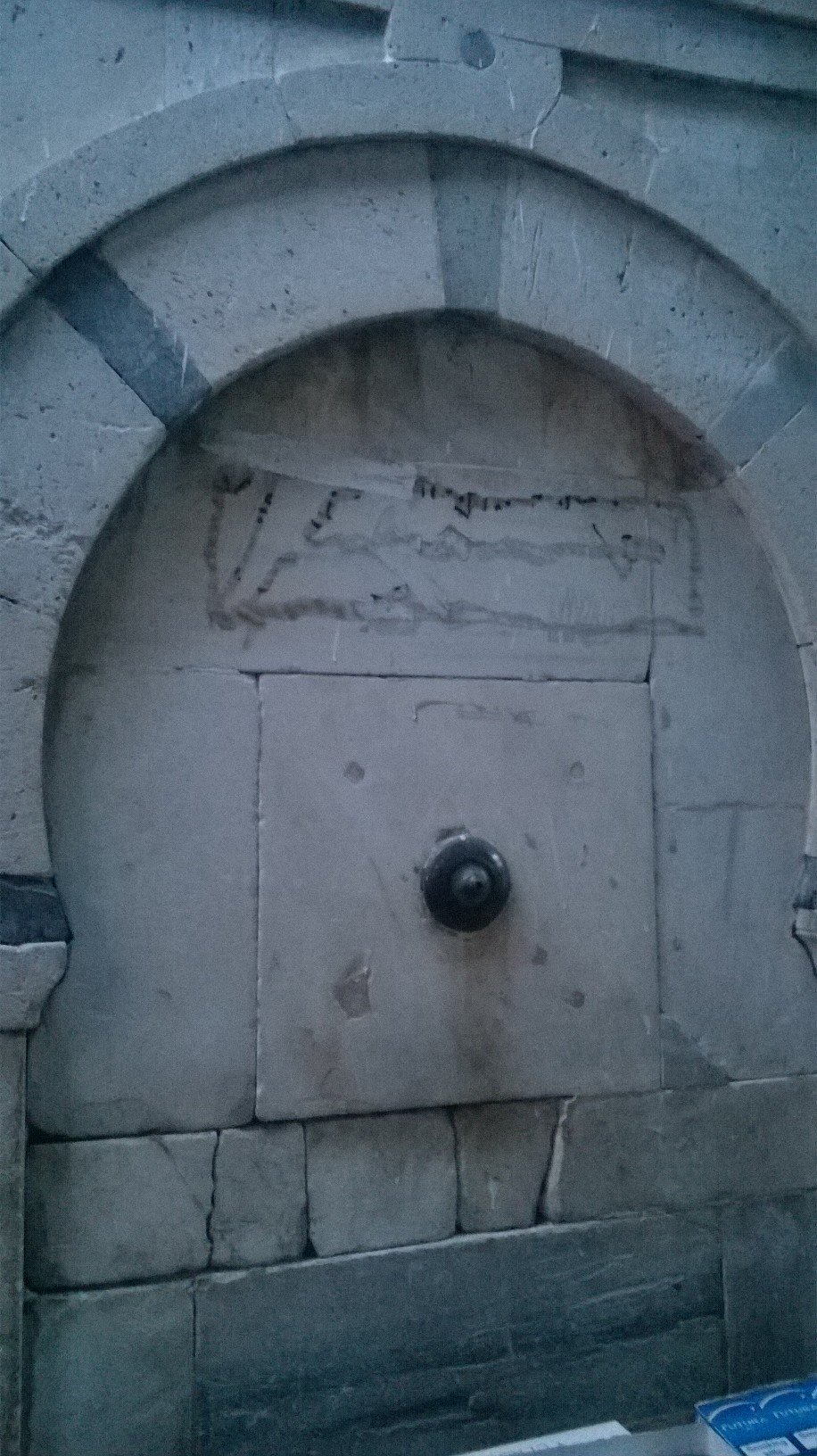
The fountain of the mosque
