= Madrasa El Jedid =

Madrasa in Tunis, Tunisia

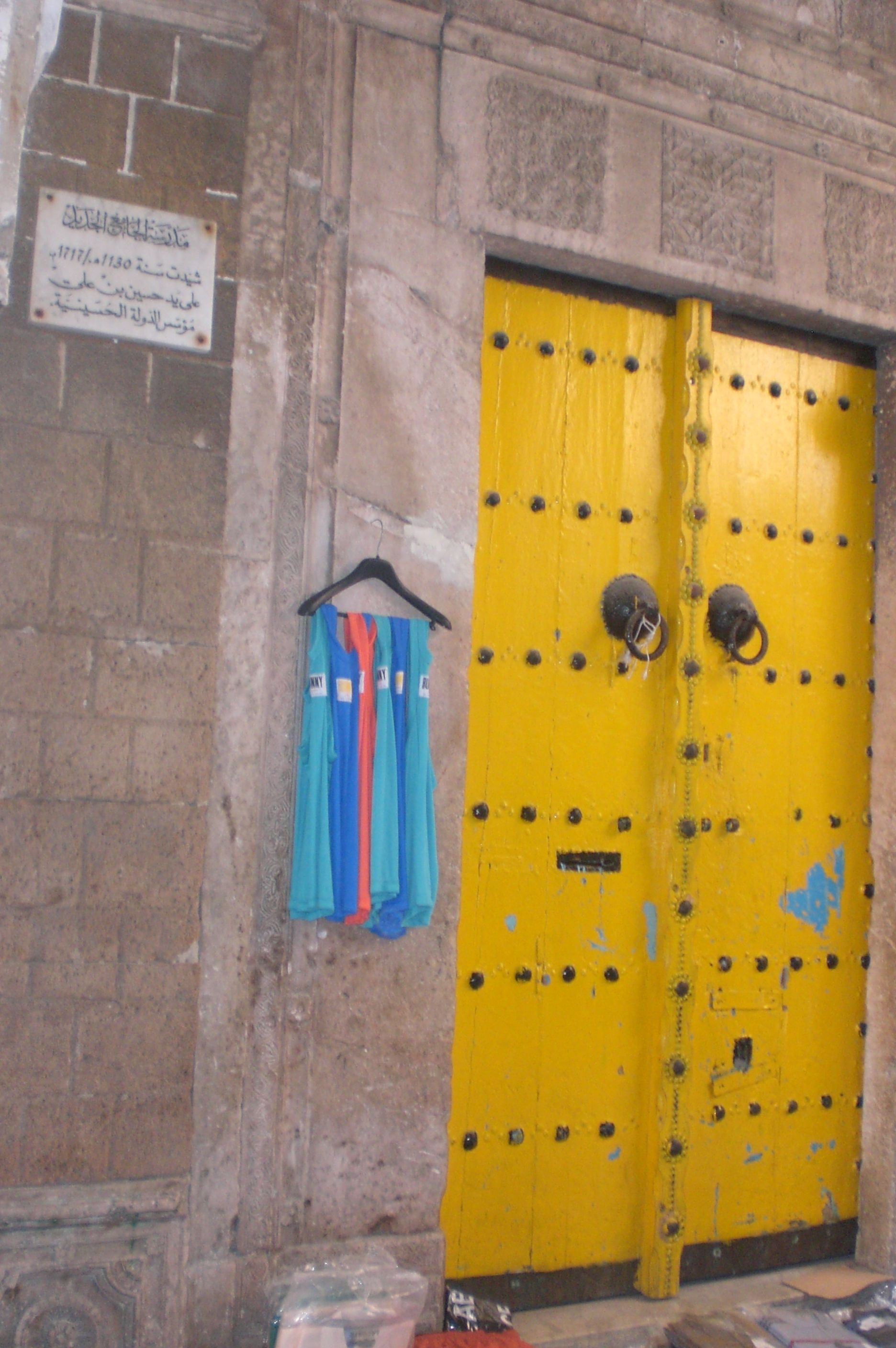
Door of the madrasa

Madrasa El Jedid (Arabic: مدرسة الجديد) is one of the madrasahs of the medina of Tunis.

Built in the Ottoman Tunisia, it is considered one of the historical monuments of the medina, thus becoming a heritage monument by the January 25th, 1922 decree.

== Location ==
This madrasa is located in the Es Sabbaghine Street (number 29) in the medina of Tunis. It is a part of an architectural complex including the El Jedid Mosque.

It is composed of fifteen rooms to accommodate students, while the Madrasa El Yusefiya stands on the upper floor.

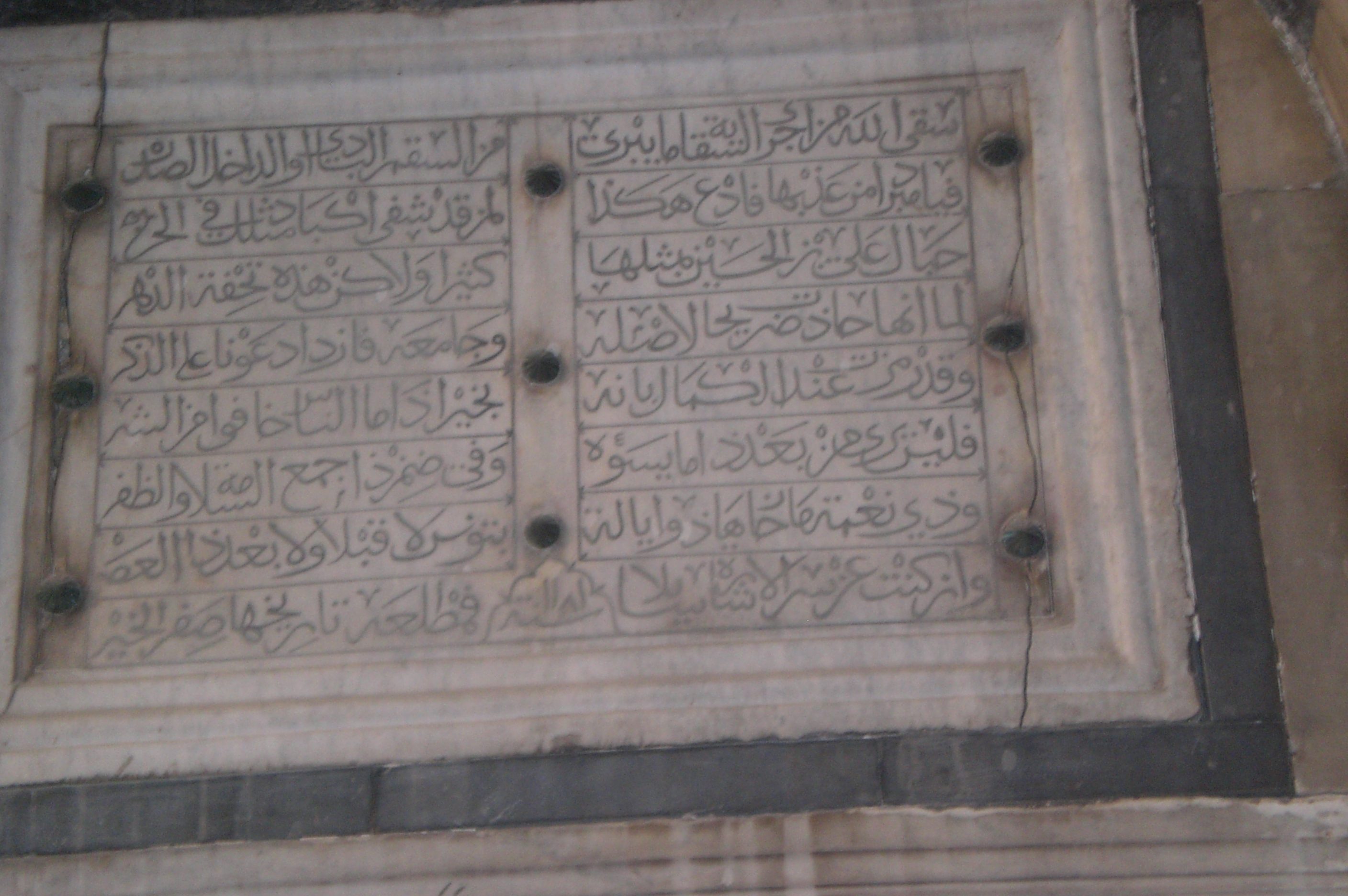
Inscription over the entrance door

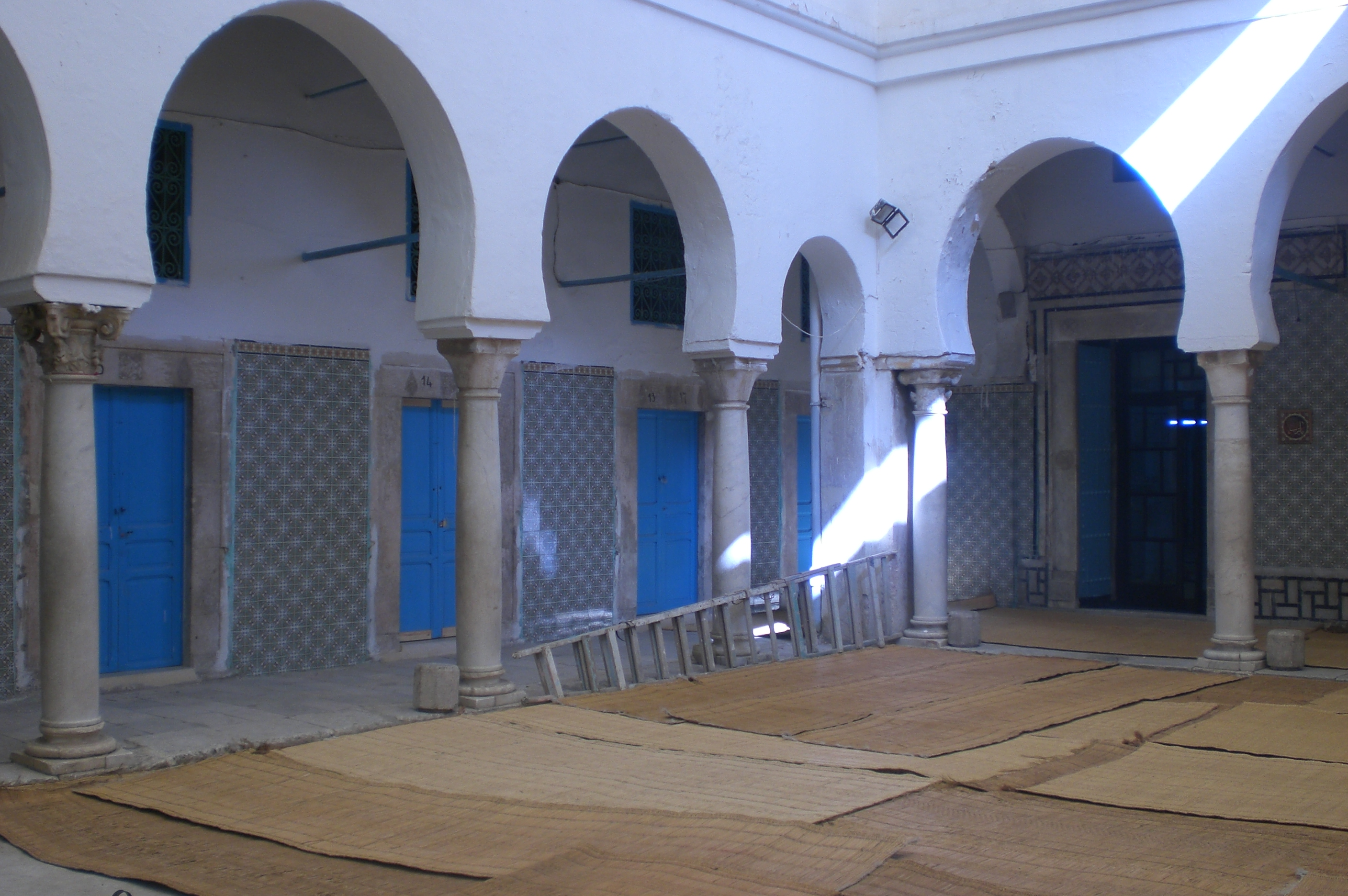
Courtyard of the madrasa

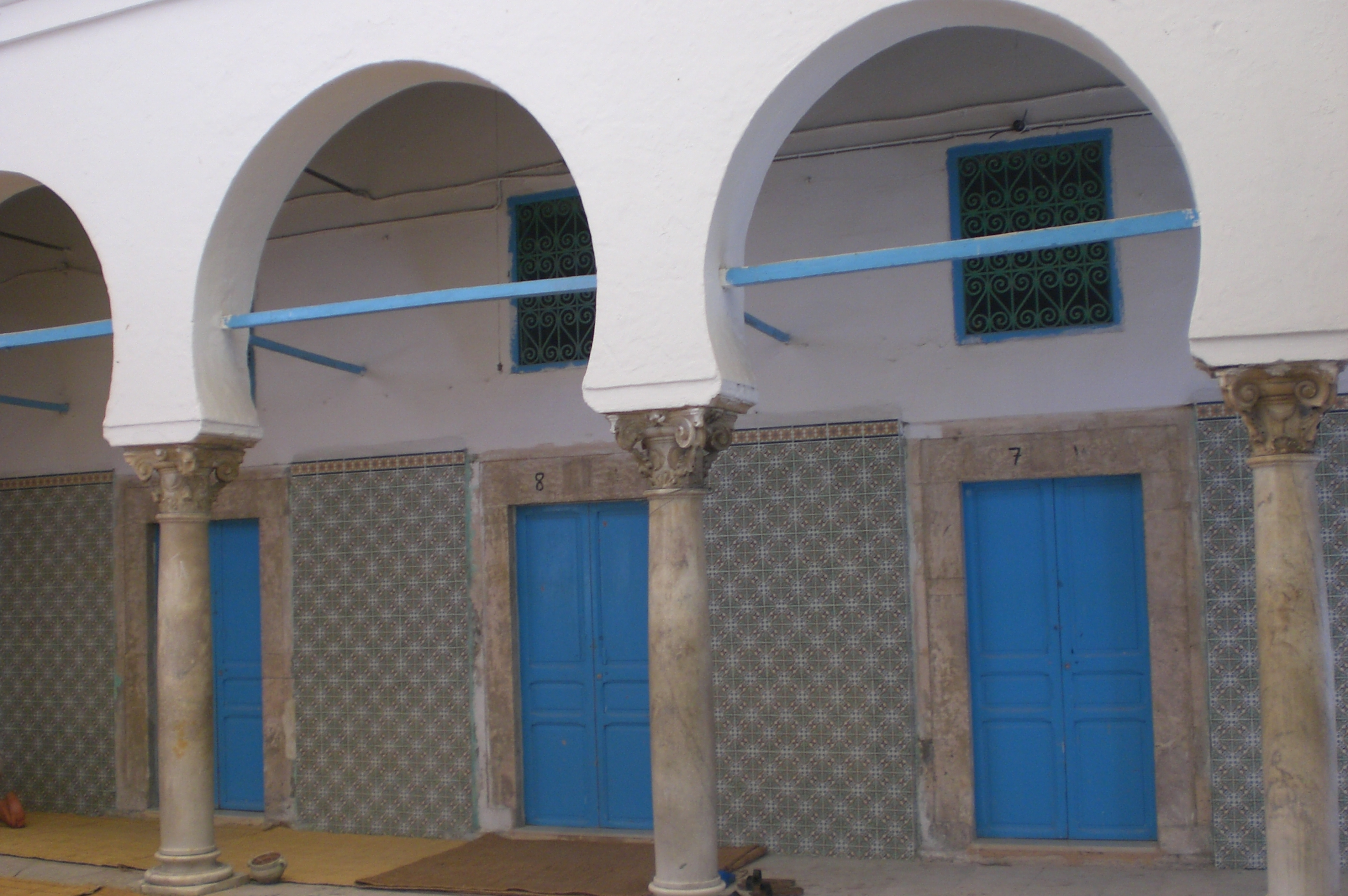
Doors of the rooms

== History ==
Madrasa El Jedid is one of four madrasas that were built during the reign of Al-Husayn I ibn Ali, the first Bey of the Husainid Dynasty.

It was founded in 1717 (1130 Hijri year) and named El Jedid because it is located just near the El Jedid Mosque.

Ahmed Bernez (1664-1726) was one of the first scholars to teach at the madrasa.

== Role ==
As for other madrasahs, the role of Madrasa El Jedid turned from educating to just accommodating Ez-Zitouna students. In 1930, 44 students were living there while the capacity was limited to 20 students.
