= Shamma'iya Madrasa =

Madrasa in Tunis, Tunisia

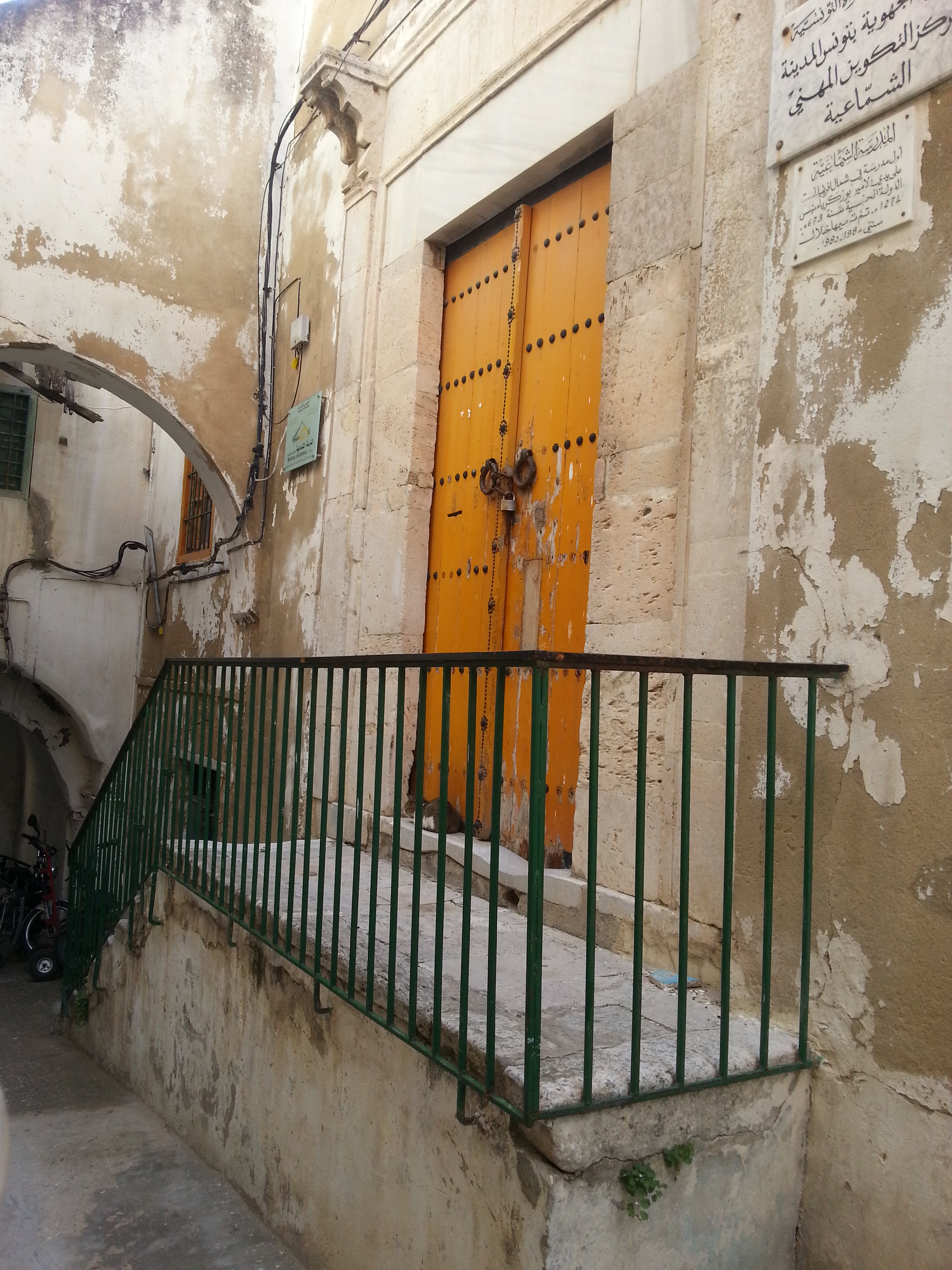
Entrance of madrasa Ech Chamaiya

The Shamma'iya Madrasa (Arabic: مدرسة الشماعية, romanized: Madrasa ash-Shamma'iya) (Note: Transliterated in French as Madrasa Chammaiya) is a historic madrasa of the Medina of Tunis. Founded by the Hafsids in the 13th century, it was the first madrasa to be built in the Maghreb.

== Location ==
It is located in Al Madrasa Ech Chamaiya alley near souk Echammaine, which later became Souk El Blaghgia.

== History ==
The Shamma'iya Madrasa was the first madrasa to be built in the whole Maghreb region. It was constructed between 1236 and 1249 on the orders of the first Hafsid sultan Abu Zakariya Yahya. Ali ibn Mohamed ibn al-Kacem was the one in charge of construction works.

The madrasa had a very important role in the society. Most of its students later became imams of Al-Zaytuna Mosque.

The madrasa was renovated in later periods. It was restored by Shaykh Abu al-Rayth al-Kashash in the 17th century, and its current form is the result of a restoration ordered by Ahmed Khuja, who was Dey of Tunis between 1640 and 1647.

== Architecture ==
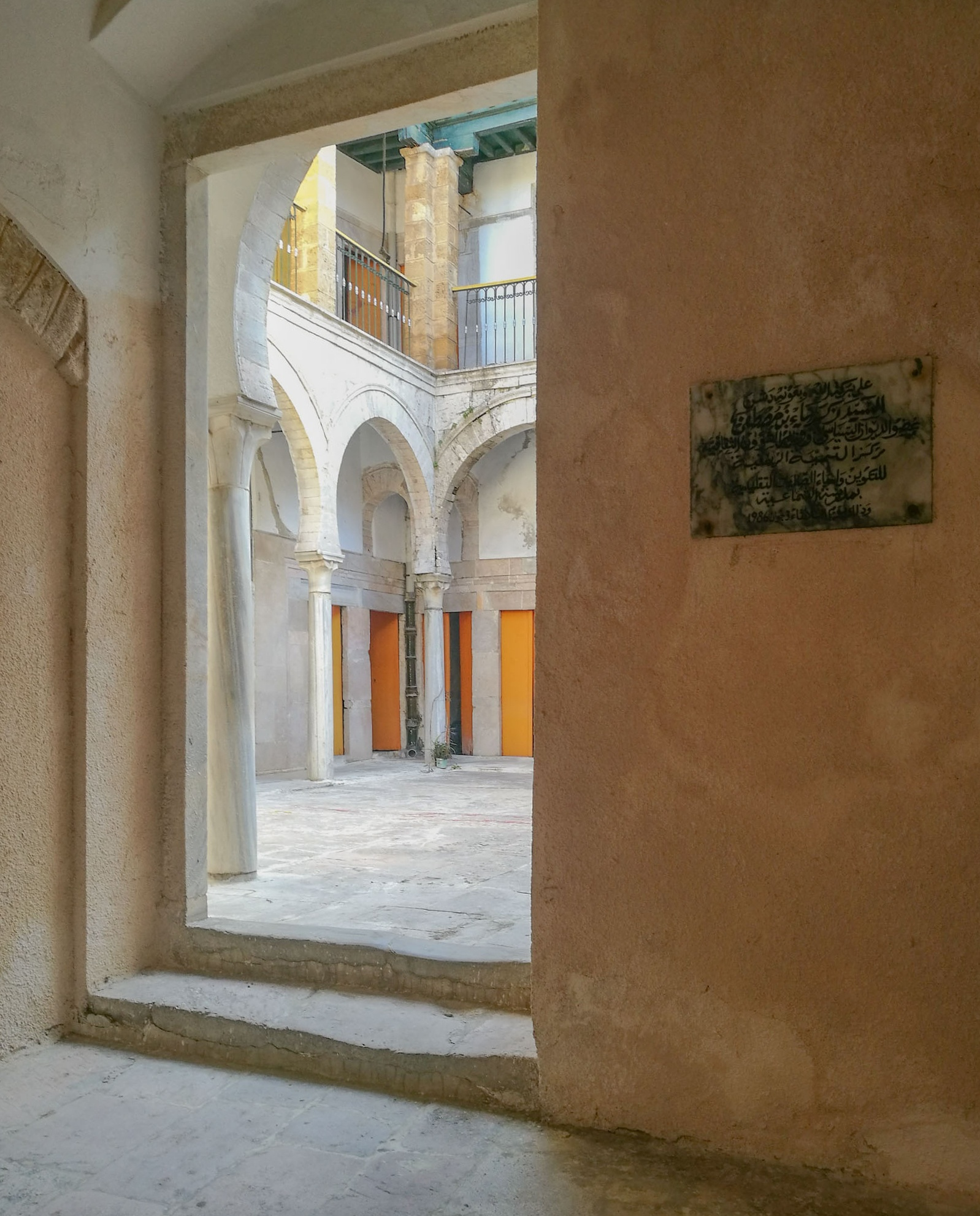
Partial view into the courtyard of the madrasa

From the street, a staircase climbs to the entrance where a bent passage leads to a central square courtyard. Across the courtyard, opposite the entrance, is a small vaulted prayer hall. In the middle of the other two sides of the courtyard are vaulted rooms, entered through large arches, which were probably classrooms. A second floor exists, with a gallery around the courtyard leading to 19 small bedrooms for students. A second, larger prayer hall is also found on the upper floor, directly above the ground floor prayer hall. The layout, in which the entrance and major rooms of the ground floor are aligned symmetrically with the two central axes of the building, may have been inspired by the layout of madrasas in Egypt or further east. It also resembles the layout of traditional houses in the medina of Tunis, and the building may have been a former house that was remodeled and repurposed into a madrasa. Due to its later renovations, none of the madrasa's original decoration, if it had any, has survived.

== Current situation ==
The madrasa was restored in the nineties and became a training center for leather and shoe artisans.
