= Madrasa El Achouria =

Madrasa in Tunis, Tunisia

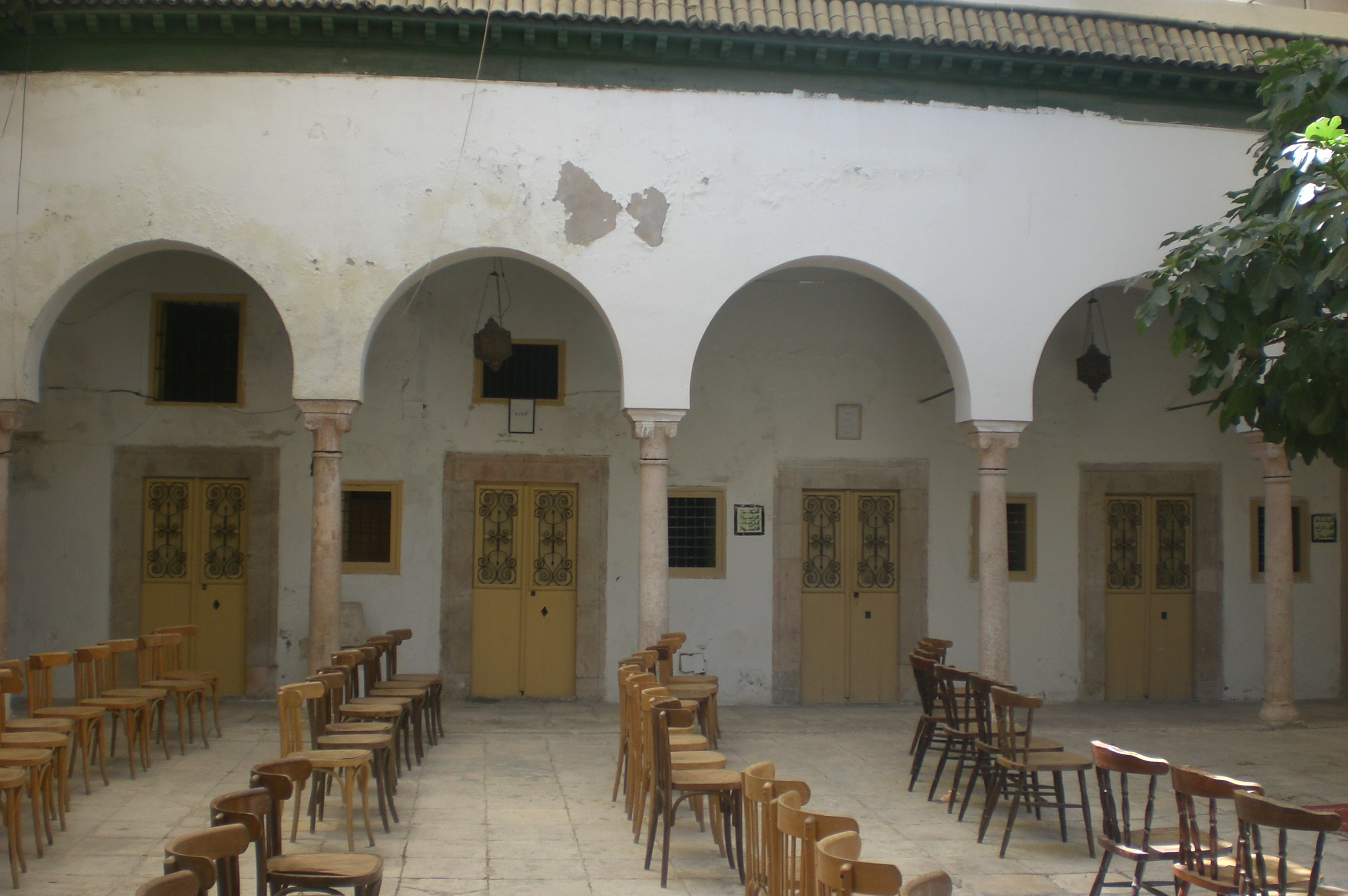
Courtyard of the madrasa

Madrasa El Achouria is one of the madrasahs of the medina of Tunis. It was built in the Ottoman Tunisia.

This madrasa became a heritage monument on October 19, 1992.

== Location ==
Located at 62 Haouanet Achour Street, from which comes its name, this madrasa is the only one that has a minaret (15,3 meters high).

It was built on the remains of Madrasa Ibn Tafargine.

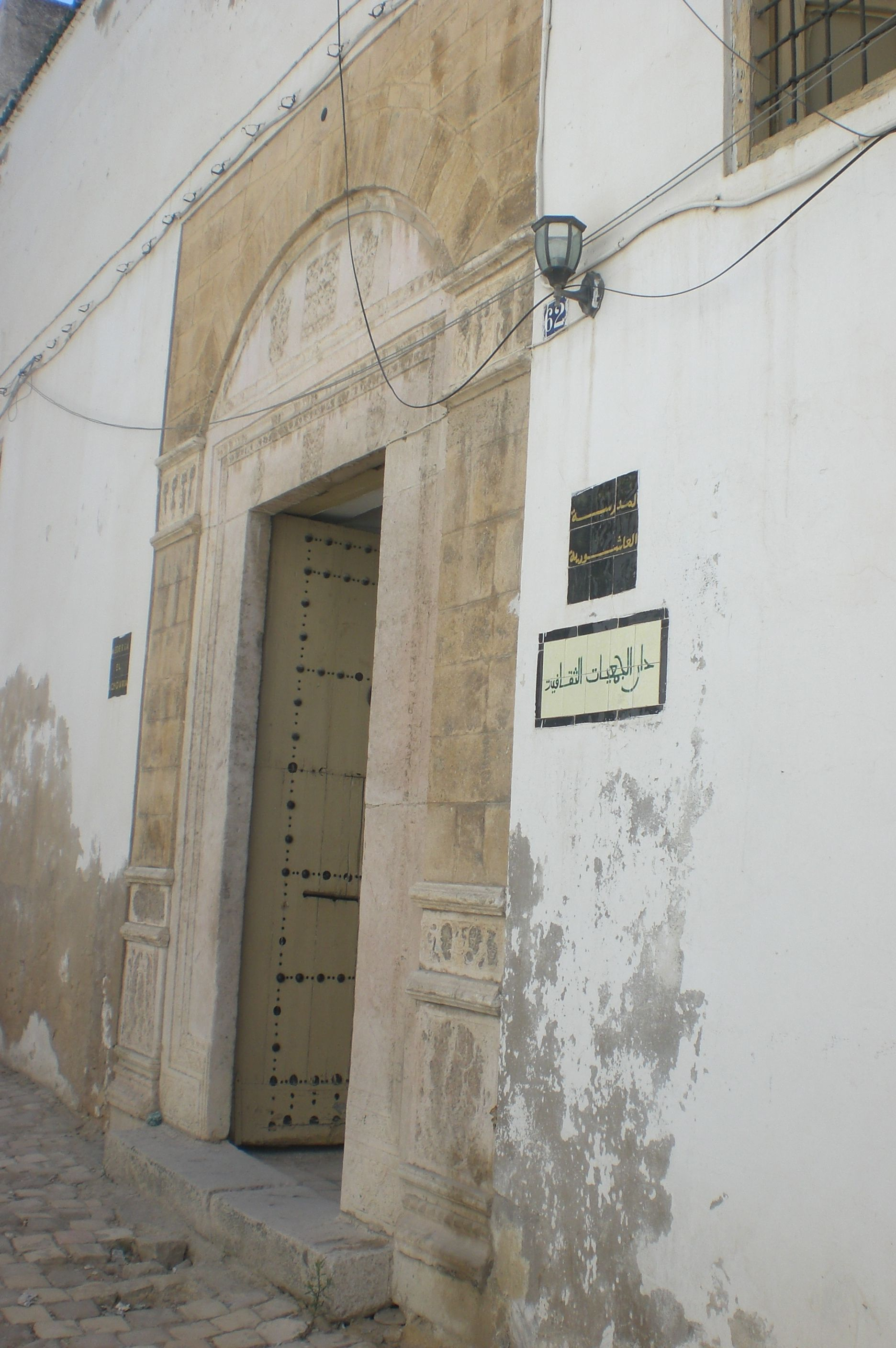
Entrance of the Madrasa Achouria

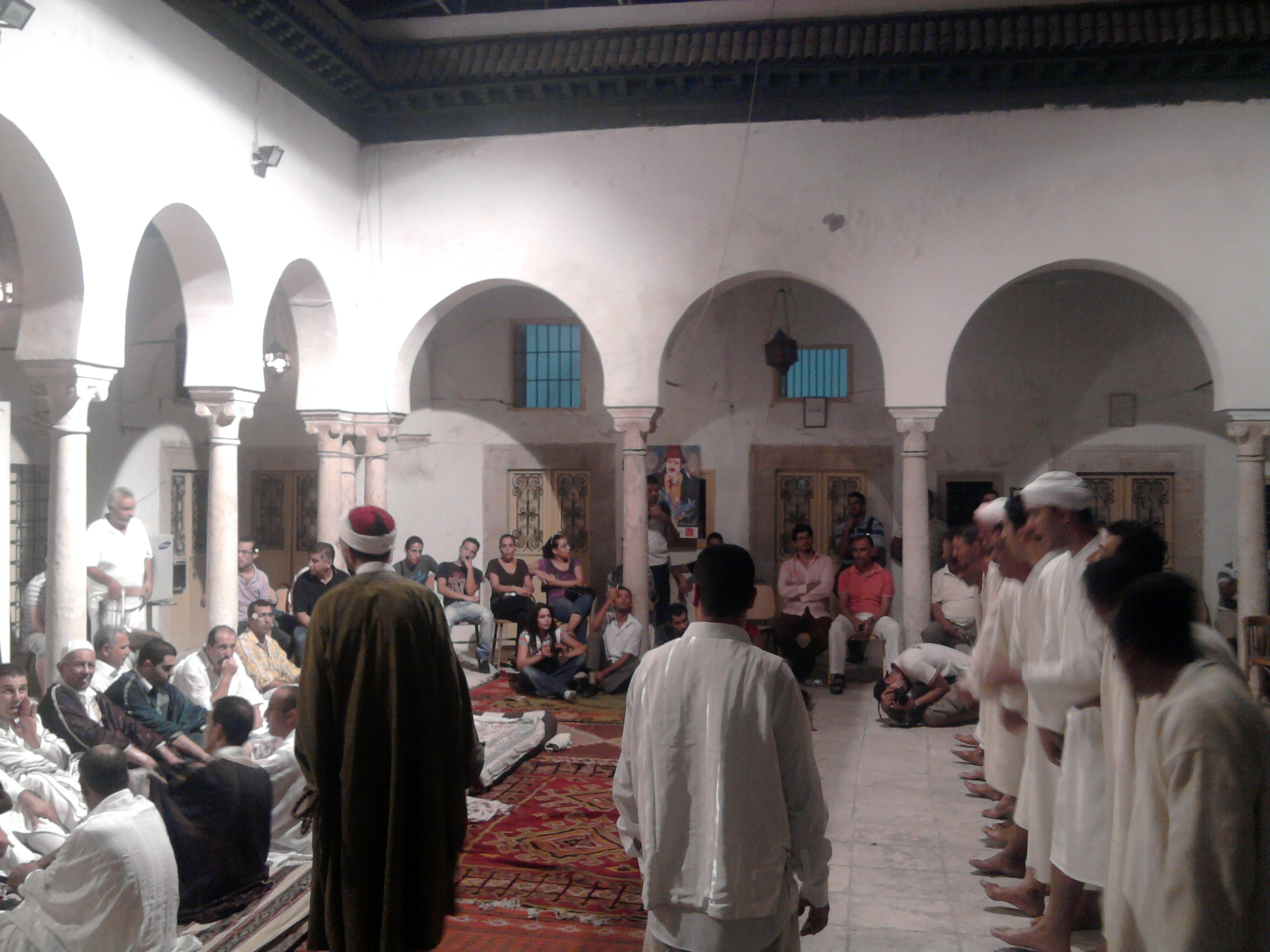
Celebration at the madrasa Achouria

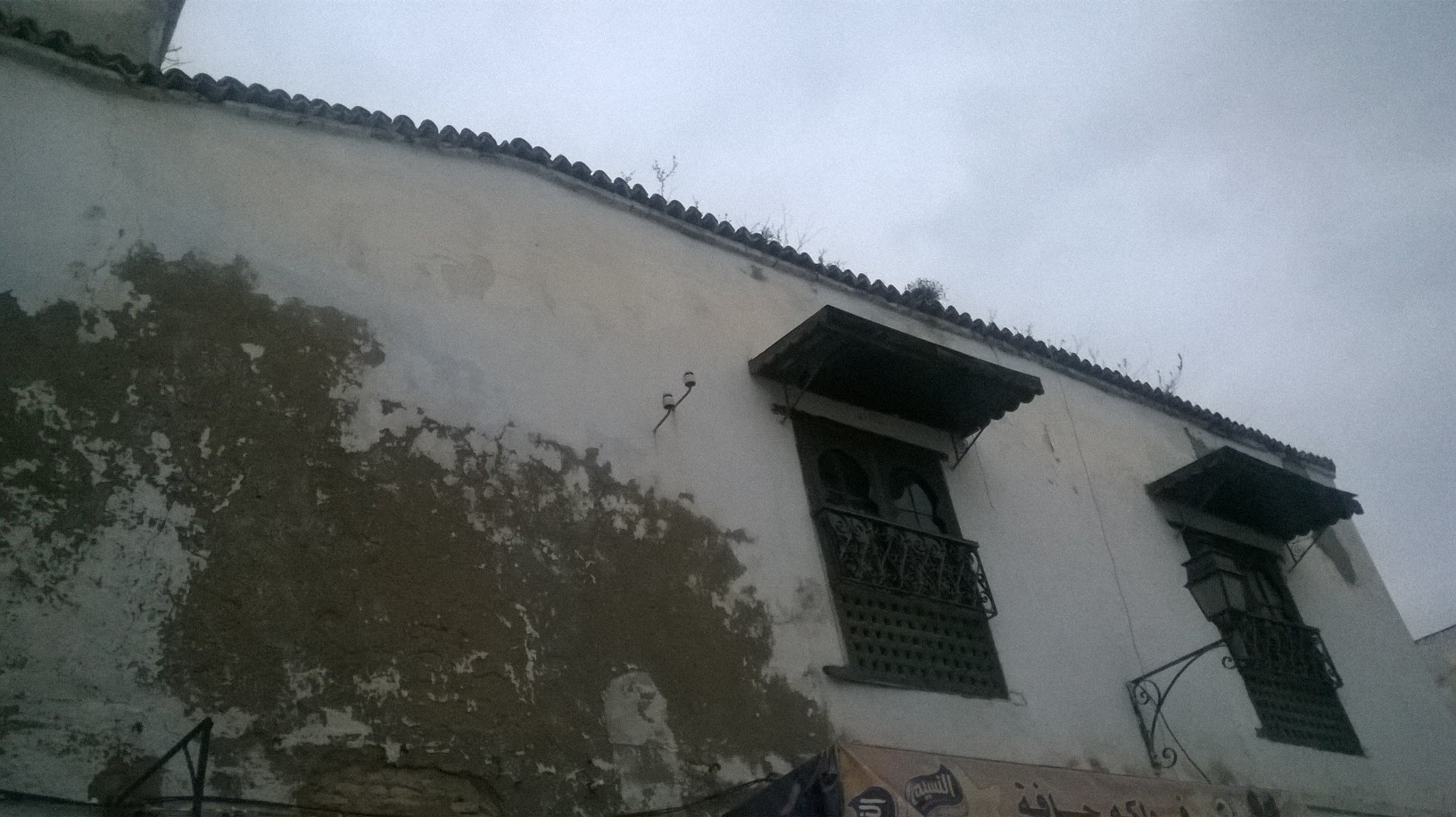
Facade of Madrasa El Achouria

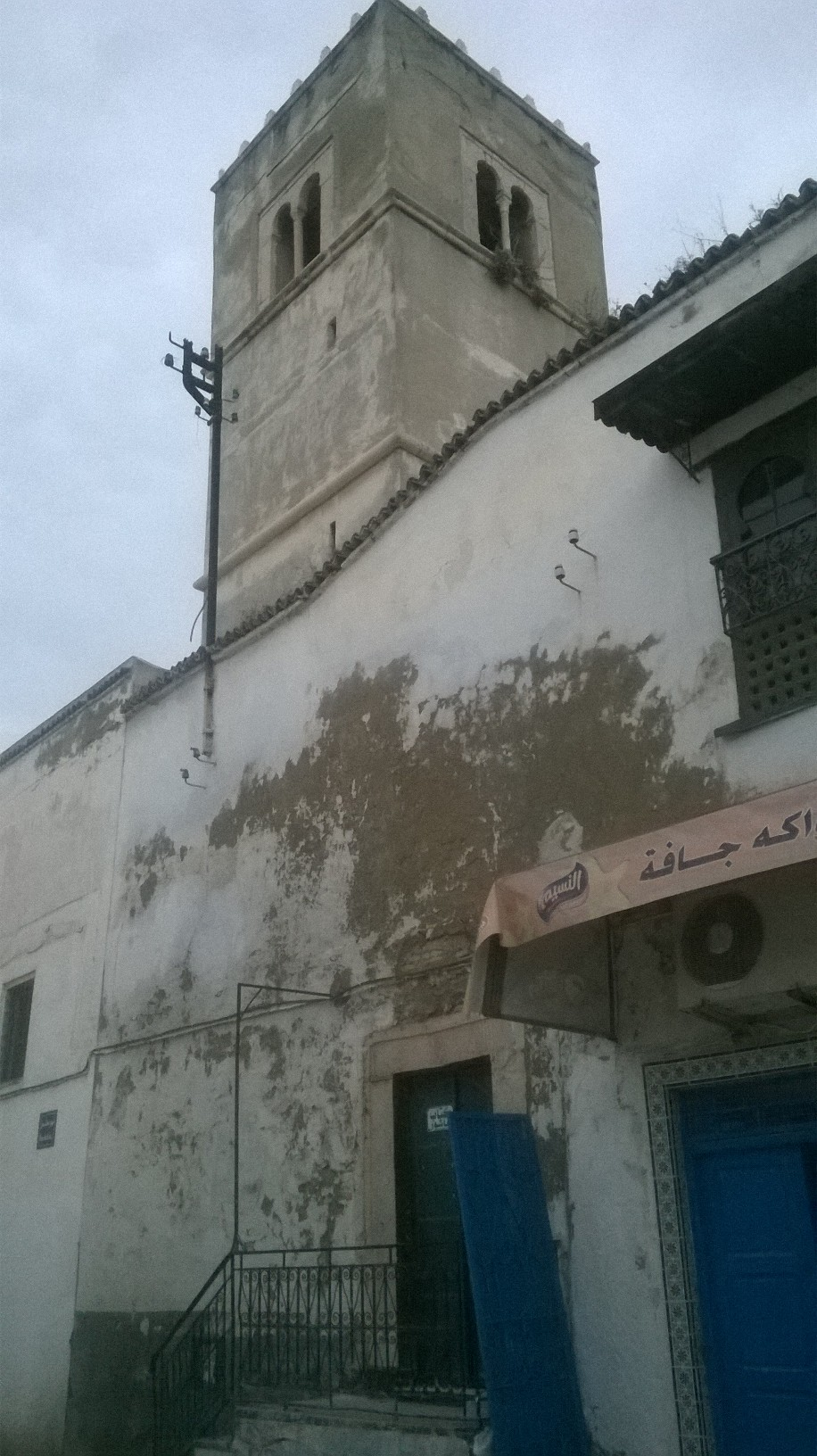
Minaret of Madrasa El Achouria
