= Madrasa El Mountaciriya =

Madrasa in Tunis, Tunisia

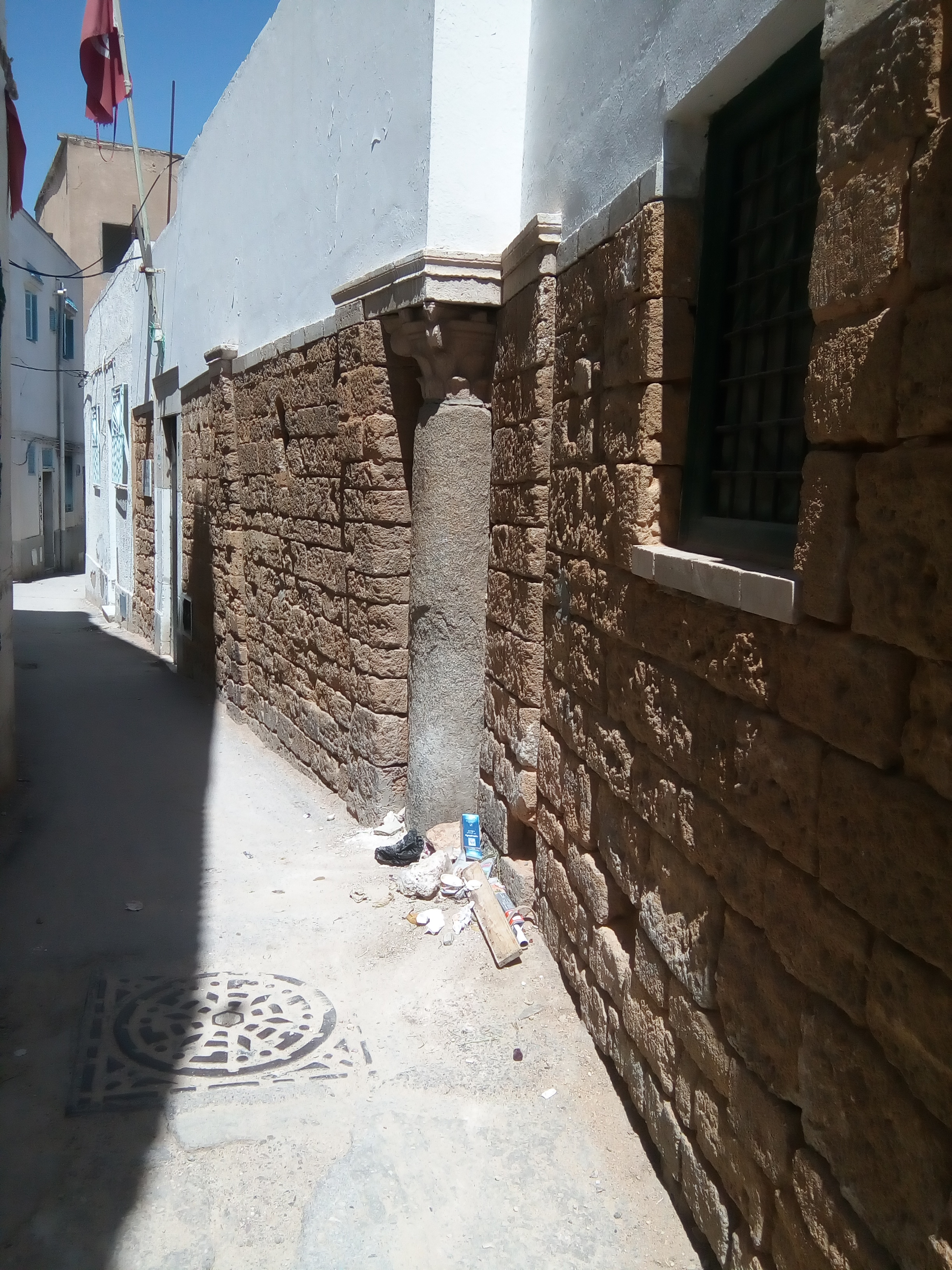
Facade of the Madrasa

Madrasa El Mountaciriya (Arabic: المدرسة المنتصرية), also known as Madrasa Al Fath, is one of the madrasahs of the medina of Tunis.

== Location ==
It is located in Les Nègres Street in Souk En Nhas.

== Etymology ==
The madrasa got its name from its founder, the Hafsid Sultan Abû `Abd Allâh Muhammad al-Mutansir.

== History ==
The construction works started in 1434 during the reign of Abû `Abd Allâh Muhammad al-Mutansir and finished in 1437 under the rule of Abou Amr Uthman. Construction was slowed by the wars occurring during the reign of al-Mutansir; the period was one of general prosperity.

== Architecture ==
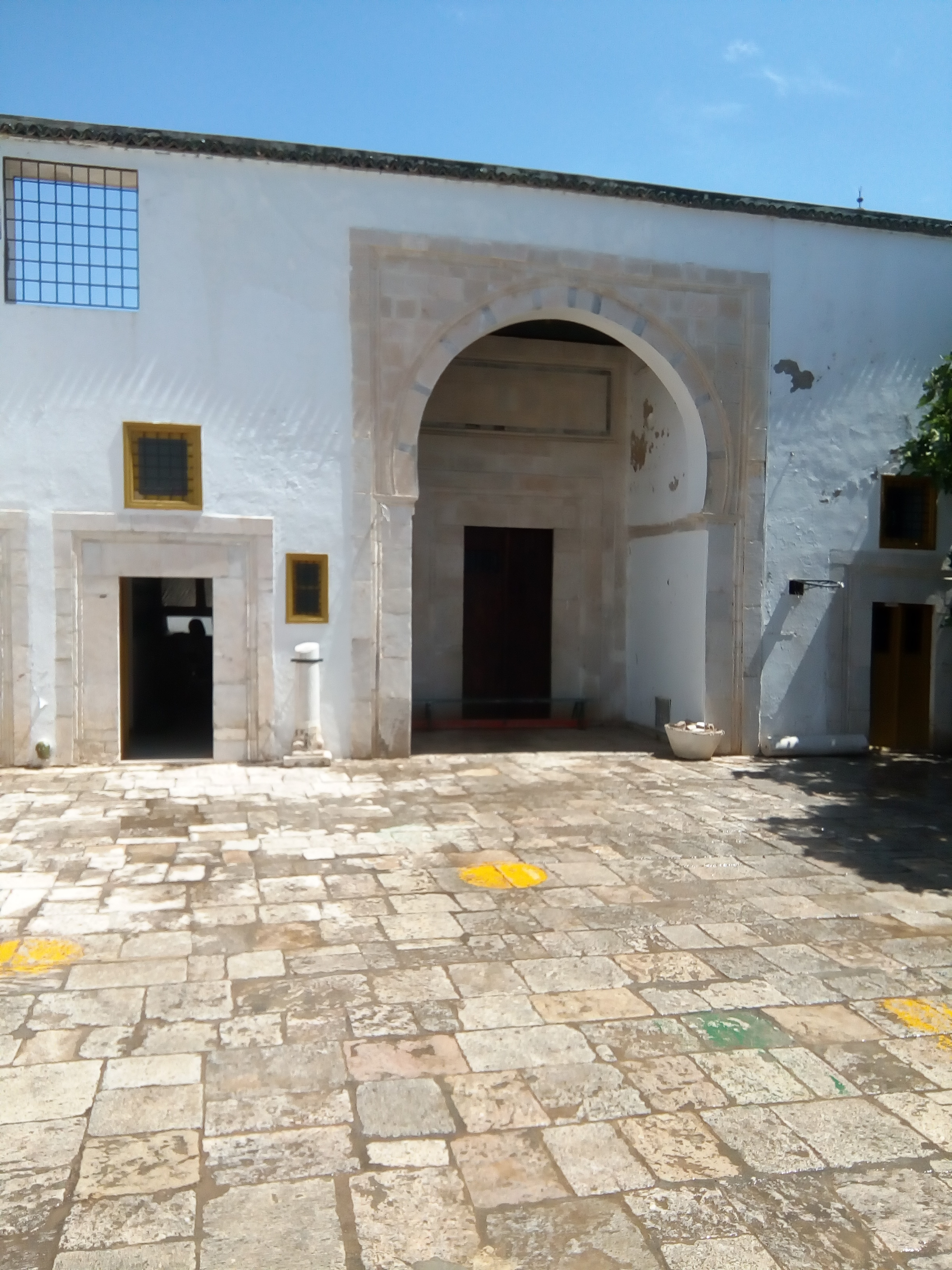
Hall of the Madrasa

The madrasa has a very sober architecture like the madrasa Andaloussiya. Both have only one floor and a very large hall covered with stones. Three of the hall's sides are occupied by the student cells while in the fourth there is an oratory. Instead of the galleries like in other madrasas, El Mountaciriya has Iwans, inspired by the oriental architecture like in Syria or Egypt.

The madrasa has also a mosque with three slabs.

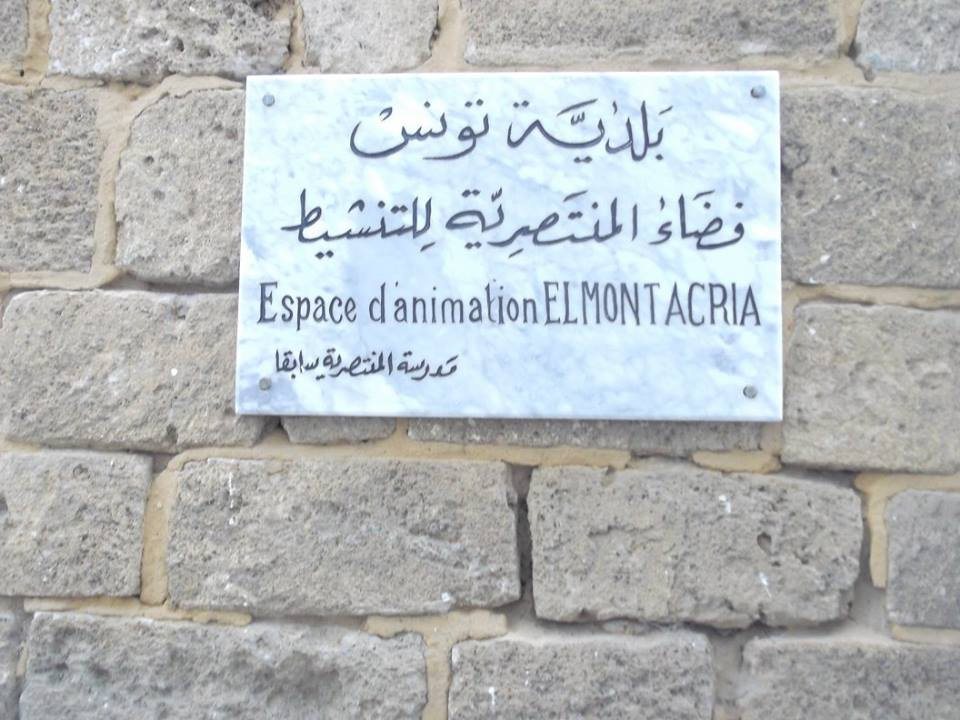
Marble plaque of the madrasa El Mountaciriya

This building has witnessed many modifications through the years. For example, Abou Ghaith Al Qachach added a dome to the prayer room. The Association de Sauvegarde de la Médina restored the building in 1995. Nowadays, it is an animation space for elderly people.
