= Madrasa El Unqiya =

Madrasa in Tunis, Tunisia

Coordinates: 36.798817°N 10.170094°E

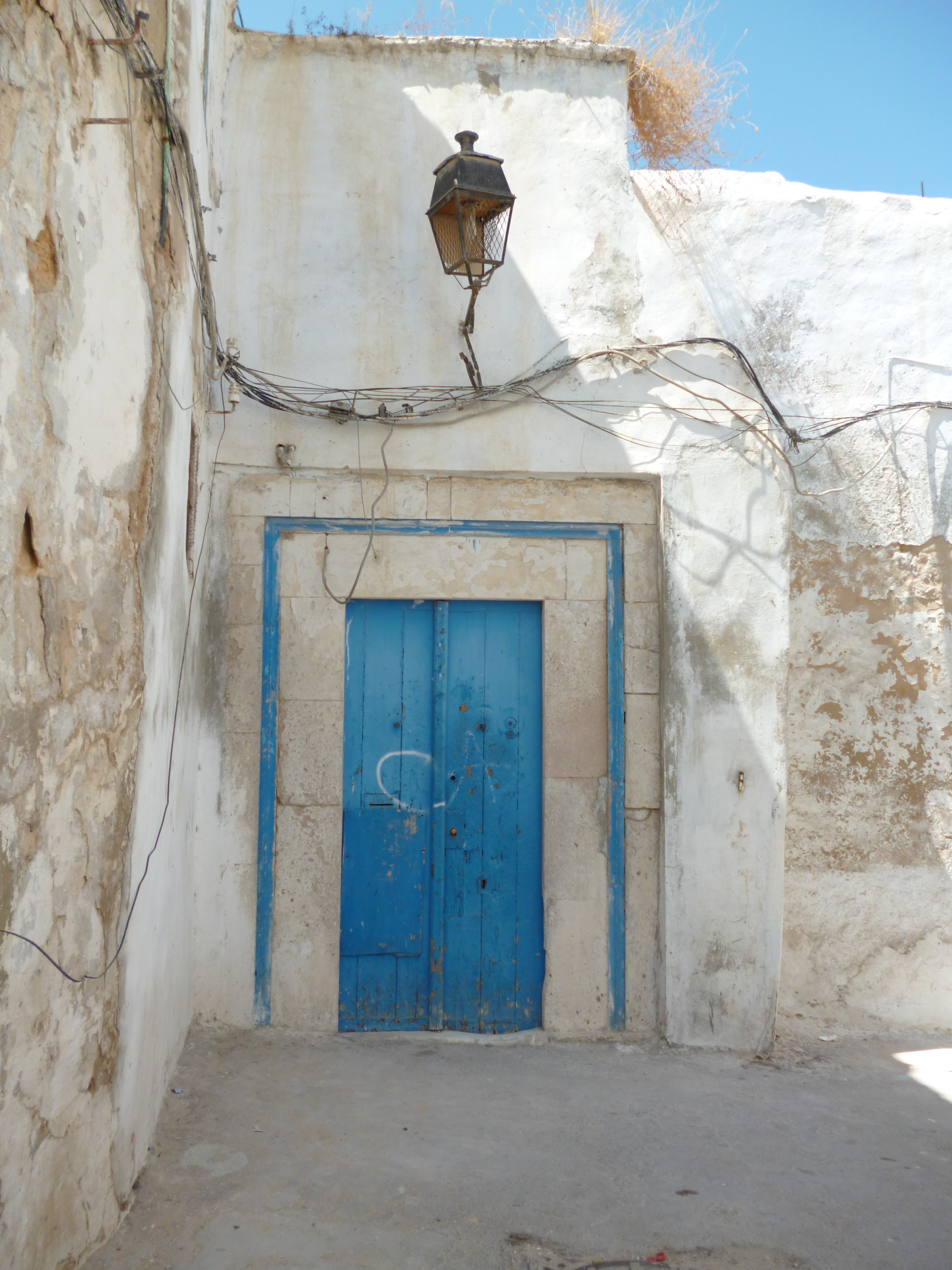
Madrasa El Unqiya's entrance

Madrasa El Unqiya (Arabic: المدرسة العنقية) is one of the madrasahs of the medina of Tunis.

== Localization ==
It is located in Onk El Jamal Street in the Medina of Tunis.

== History ==
It was built in 1333 era under the orders of the sister of the Hafsid sultan Abu Yahya Abu Bakr al-Mutawakkil. Muhammad Ibn Abdel-Salam al-Hawari, the professor of Ibn Khaldoun was the first director of this madrasah in 1341. In the 16th century and during the Ottoman era, Ahmed Khodja Dey restored the madrasa and ordered to teach the Hanafite doctrine. It became a classified monument on 19 October 1992.

== Evolution ==
Nowadays, the madrasa is not used and in danger.

== Architecture ==
It has the hafsid style of the 14th century and a typical architecture of the madrasa: a hall surrounded with four halls and 14 rooms. It has also an oratory that was used as a teaching and a prayer room at the same time. The facade of the madrasa has a simple decoration.
