= Al-Ahmadiyah Madrasa =

Madrasa in Aleppo, Syria

Coordinates: 36°11′54.5″N 37°9′24″E

al-Ahmadiyah Madrasa
- الْمَدْرَسَة الْأَحْمَدِيَّة

Location
- Jallum district Aleppo; Syria

Information
- Type: madrasa
- Established: 1724
- Campus: Urban
- Affiliation: Islamic

Al-Ahmadiyah Madrasa (Arabic: الْمَدْرَسَة الْأَحْمَدِيَّة, romanized: al-Madrasa al-ʾAḥmadīyah) is a madrasa complex in old Aleppo, Syria.

== See also ==
- Al-Firdaws Madrasa
- Al-Sultaniyah Madrasa
- Al-Uthmaniyah Madrasa
- Al-Zahiriyah Madrasa
- Ancient City of Aleppo
- Khusruwiyah Mosque
