= Al-Muqaddamiyah Madrasa =

Madrasa in Aleppo, Syria

al-Muqaddamiyah Madrasa
- الْمَدْرَسَة الْمُقَدَّمِيَّة

Location
- Jallum district Aleppo; Syria

Information
- Type: madrasa
- Established: 1168
- Campus: Urban
- Affiliation: Islamic

Al-Muqaddamiyah Madrasa (Arabic: الْمَدْرَسَة الْمُقَدَّمِيَّة, romanized: al-Madrasa al-Muqaddamīyah) is a madrasa complex in Aleppo, Syria.

== See also ==
- Al-Firdaws Madrasa
- Al-Sultaniyah Madrasa
- Al-Uthmaniyah Madrasa
- Al-Zahiriyah Madrasa
- Ancient City of Aleppo
- Khusruwiyah Mosque
