= Adli =

Adli or Adly may refer to:

- Adly, a Taiwanese scooter manufacturer
- Adli (name)
