= Al-Sharafiyah Madrasa =

Madrasa in Aleppo, Syria

Coordinates: 36°11′59″N 37°9′28″E

al-Sharafiyah Madrasa
- الْمَدْرَسَة الشَّرَفِيَّة
- Aleppo; Syria

Information
- Type: madrasa
- Established: 1242
- Campus: Urban
- Affiliation: Islamic

Al-Sharafiyah Madrasa (Arabic: الْمَدْرَسَة الشَّرَفِيَّة, romanized: al-Madrasa aš-Šarafīyah) is a madrasa complex in Aleppo, Syria.

== See also ==
- Al-Firdaws Madrasa
- Al-Sultaniyah Madrasa
- Al-Uthmaniyah Madrasa
- Al-Zahiriyah Madrasa
- Ancient City of Aleppo
- Khusruwiyah Mosque
