= Al-Kameliyah Madrasa =

Madrasa in Aleppo, Syria

Coordinates: 36°11′16″N 37°9′38″E

al-Kamiliyah Madrasa
- الْمَدْرَسَة الْكَامِلِيَّة
- Aleppo; Syria

Information
- Type: madrasa
- Established: 1237
- Campus: Urban
- Affiliation: Islamic

Al-Kamiliyah Madrasa (Arabic: الْمَدْرَسَة الْكَامِلِيَّة, romanized: al-Madrasa al-Kāmilīyah) is a madrasa complex in Aleppo, Syria.

== See also ==
- Al-Firdaws Madrasa
- Al-Sultaniyah Madrasa
- Al-Uthmaniyah Madrasa
- Al-Zahiriyah Madrasa
- Ancient City of Aleppo
- Khusruwiyah Mosque
