= Al-Qudsi =

Al-Qudsi (Arabic: القدسي, romanized: al-Qudsī, lit. 'the Jerusalemite') is an Arabic nisba. Notable people with the surname include:

- Adli Qudsi, Syrian architect
- Kamil Pasha al-Qudsi, former Governor General of the State of Aleppo
- Nazim al-Qudsi, former president of Syria
- Safwan al-Qudsi, Syrian politician
