= Ancient Aleppo =

Historic city centre of Aleppo, Syria

UNESCO World Heritage Site
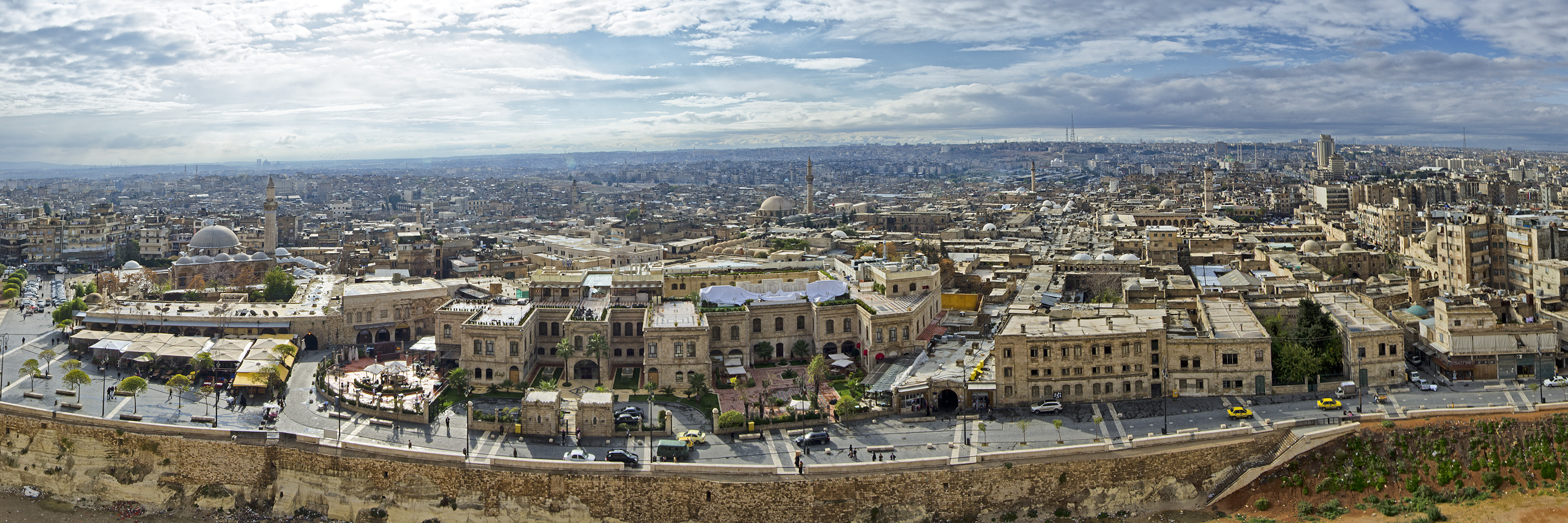
- Ancient Aleppo

- Location within Syria Location within West and Central Asia
- Location: Aleppo, Syria
- Includes: Citadel of Aleppo, Al-Madina Souq
- Criteria: Cultural: (iii), (iv)
- Reference: 21
- Inscription: 1986 (10th Session)
- Endangered: 2013–2020
- Area: 364 ha (1.41 sq mi)
- Coordinates: 36°12′09″N 37°09′46″E

The Ancient City of Aleppo (Arabic: مدينة حلب القديمة, romanized: Madīnat Ḥalab al-Qadīma) is the historic city centre of Aleppo, Syria. Prior to the Syrian Civil War, many districts of the ancient city remained essentially unchanged since they were initially constructed between the 11th and 16th centuries. Being subjected to constant invasions and political instability, the inhabitants of the city were forced to build economically independent cell-like quarters and districts, most of which were delineated along ethnic and religious lines. These urban subdistricts, along with the ancient walled city that they surround, comprise an approximate area of 350 hectares (860 acres; 3.5 km^{2}) and are home to more than 120,000 residents.

Characterized by its large mansions, narrow alleys, covered souqs and ancient caravanserais, the Ancient City of Aleppo became a UNESCO World Heritage Site in 1986.

An estimated 30% of the Ancient City of Aleppo was destroyed in the Battle of Aleppo during the Syrian civil war, including many sections of the Al-Madina Souq and other structures dating back to medieval times.

== Origins and founding ==
Lying on the left bank of Queiq River the ancient city was surrounded by a circle of eight hills surrounding a prominent central hill on which the castle (originally a temple dating to the 2nd millennium BC) was erected in the shape of an acropolis. The radius of the circle is about 10 km (6 mi). The hills are Tell as-Sawda, Tell ʕāysha, Tell as-Sett, Tell al-Yāsmīn (Al-ʕaqaba), Tell al-Ansāri (Yārūqiyya), ʕan at-Tall, al-Jallūm, Baḥsīta. With an approximate area of 160 hectares (400 acres; 1.6 km^{2}), the ancient city was enclosed within a historic wall of 5 km (3 mi) in circuit that was last rebuilt by the Mamlukes. The wall has since mostly disappeared. It had nine gates (5 of them are well preserved) and was surrounded by a broad deep ditch.

The newer Jdeydeh quarters of the old city were first built by the Christians during the early 15th century in the northern suburbs of the ancient city, after the Mongol withdrawal from Aleppo. Jdeydeh is one of the finest examples of a cell-like quarter in Aleppo. As a result of the economic development, many other quarters were established outside the walls of the ancient city during the 15th and 16th centuries.

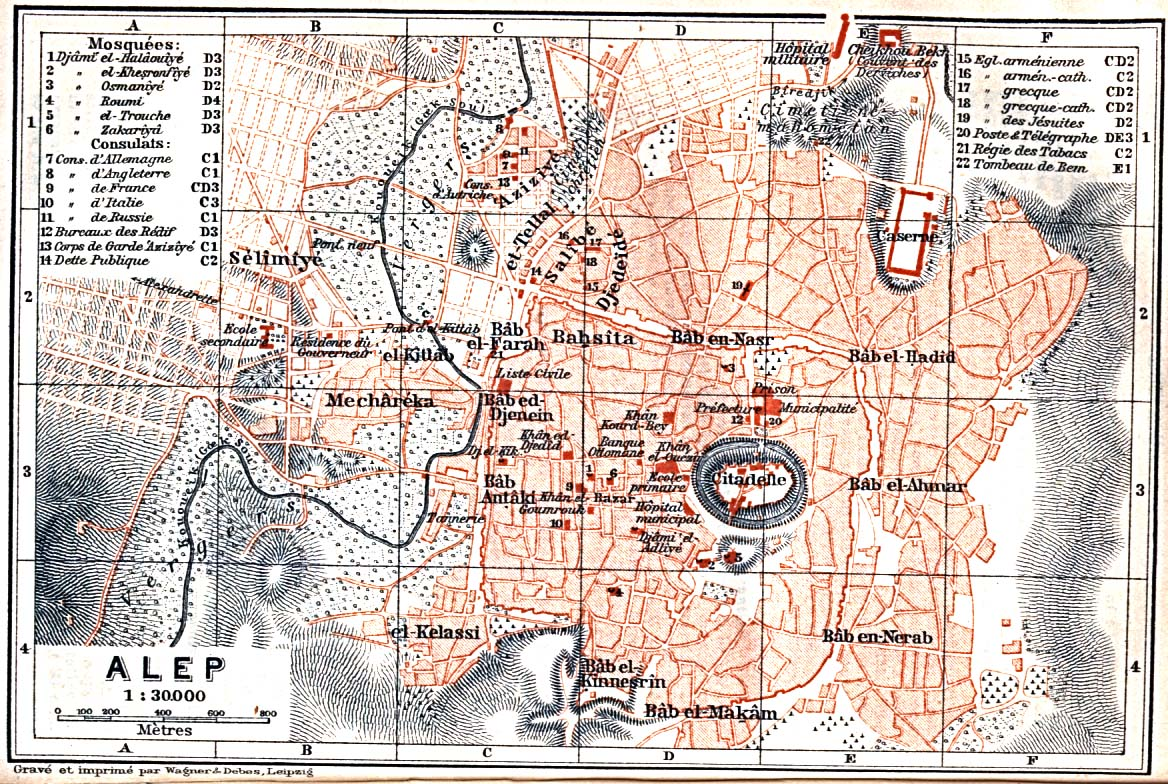
Aleppo in 1912

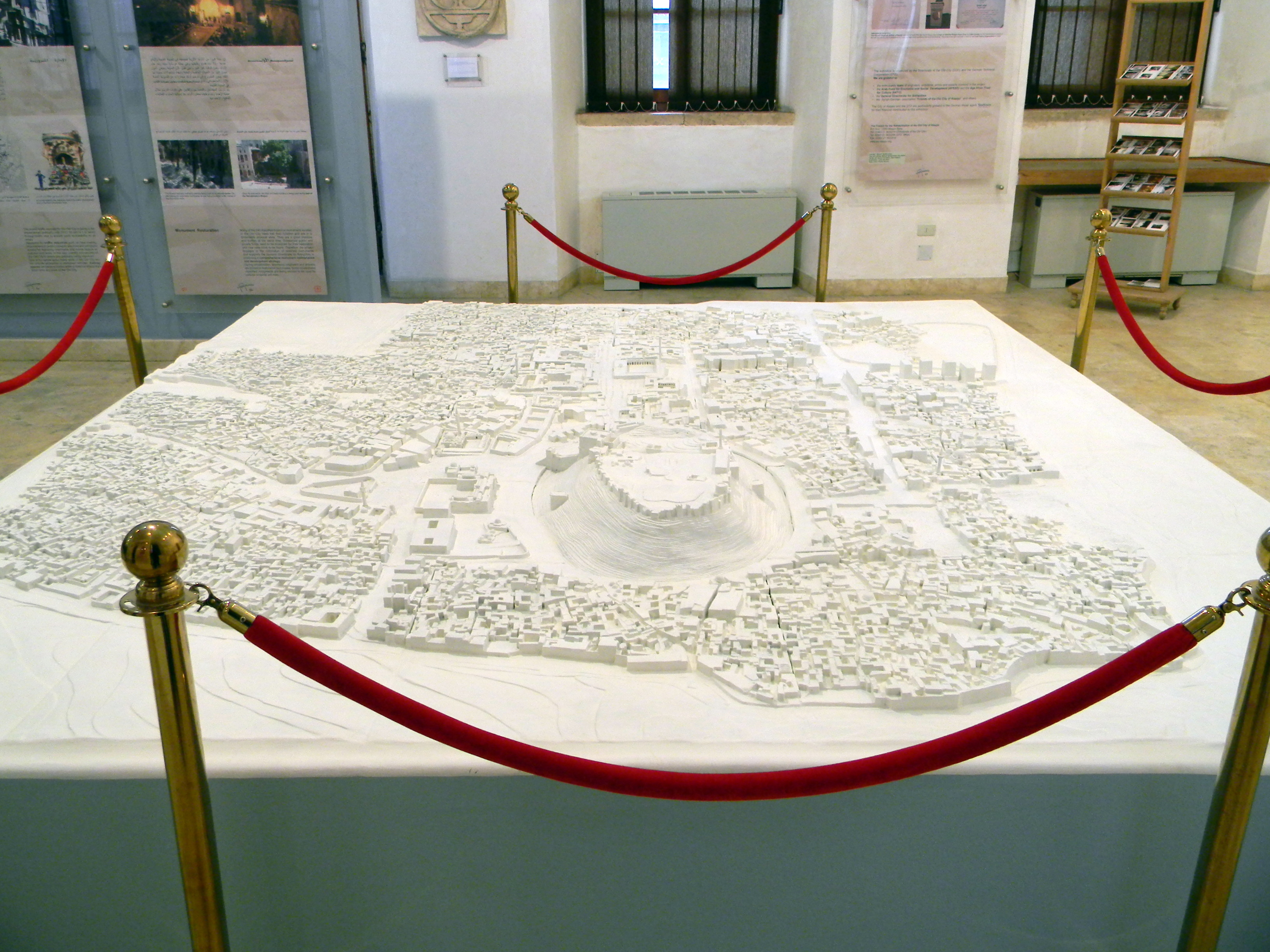
Pattern of ancient Aleppo

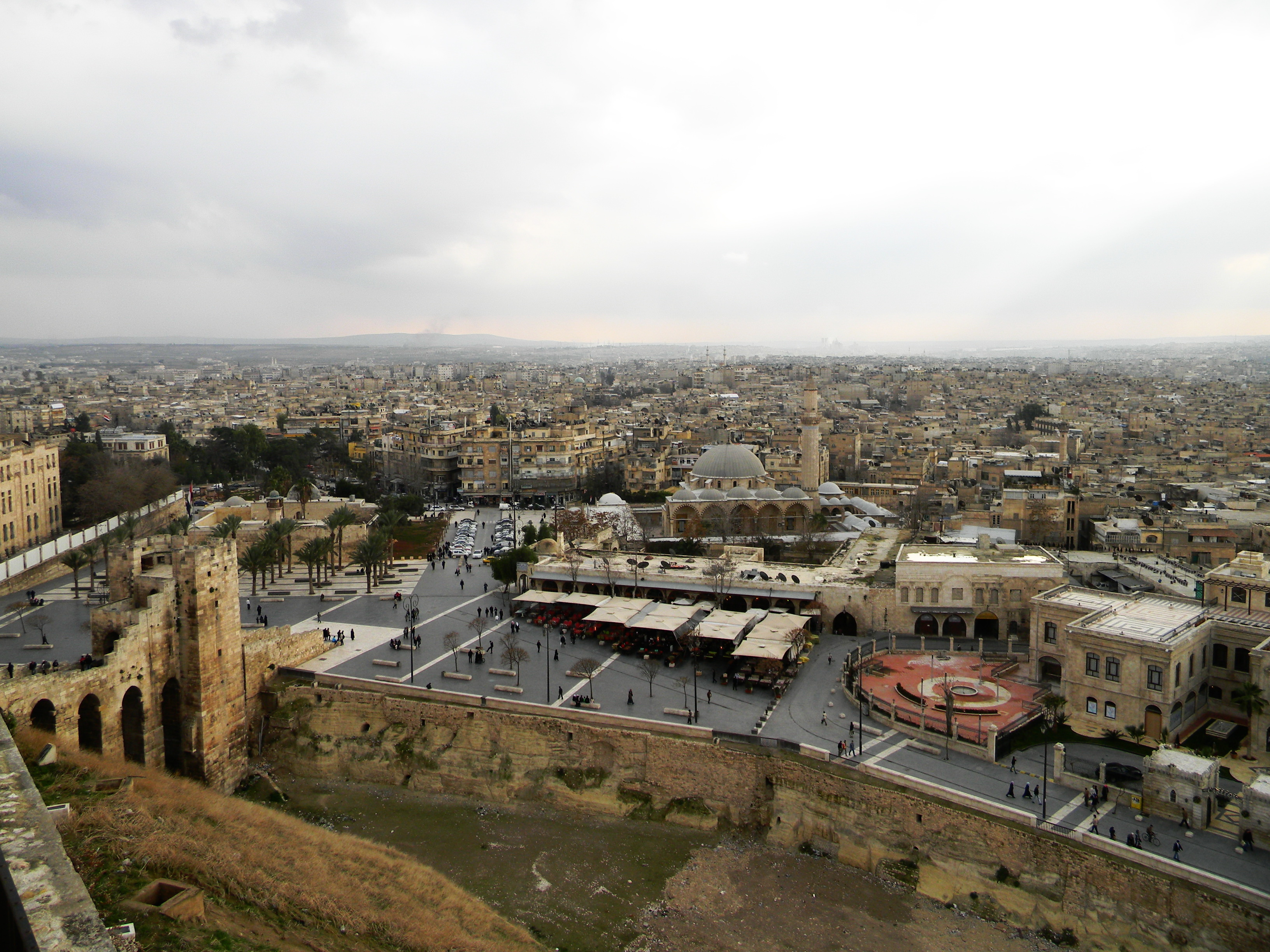
Khusruwiyah Mosque, Khan al-Shouneh and Carlton Citadel Hotel were all destroyed during the battle of Aleppo

== History ==
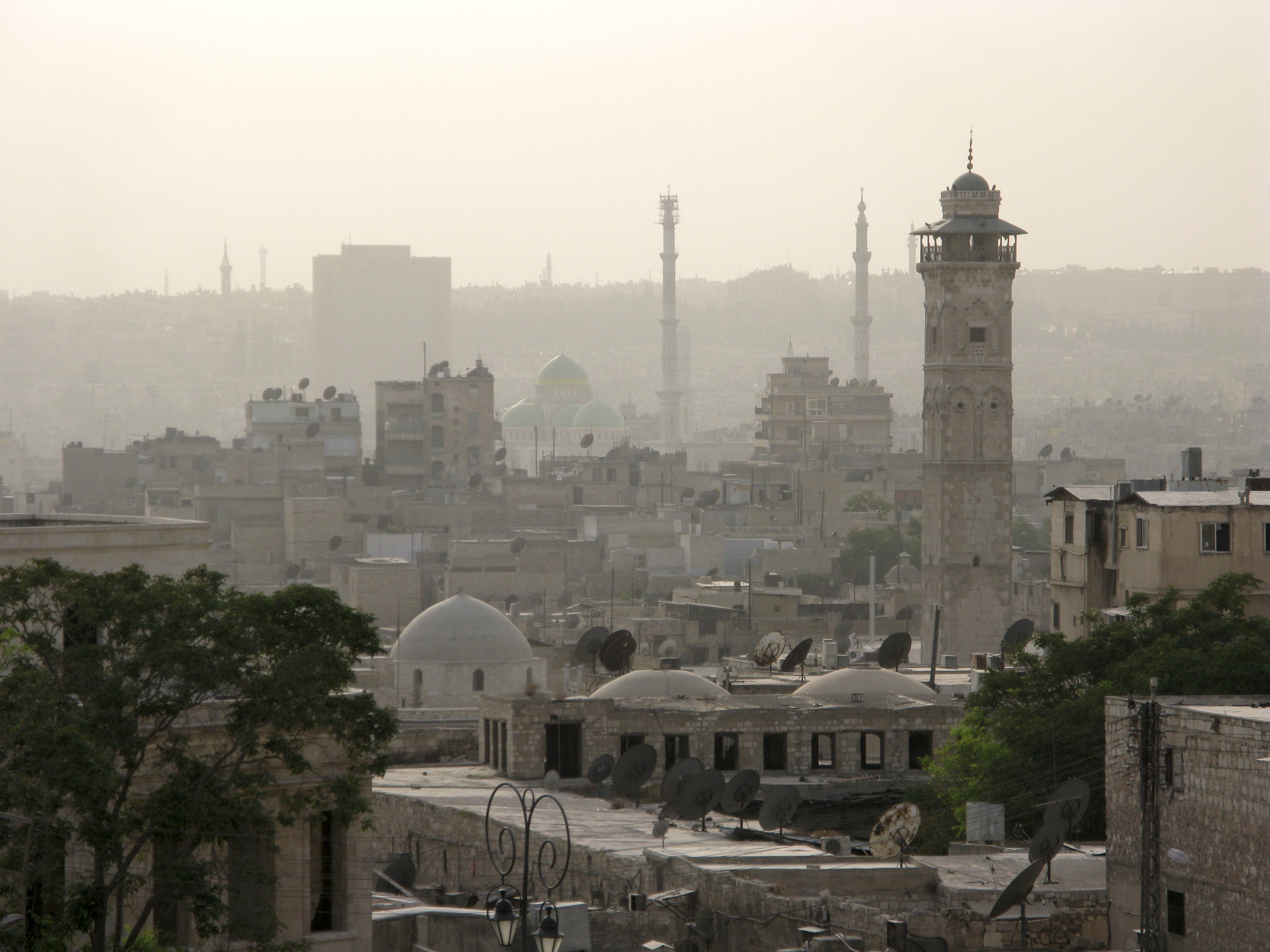
Ancient Aleppo

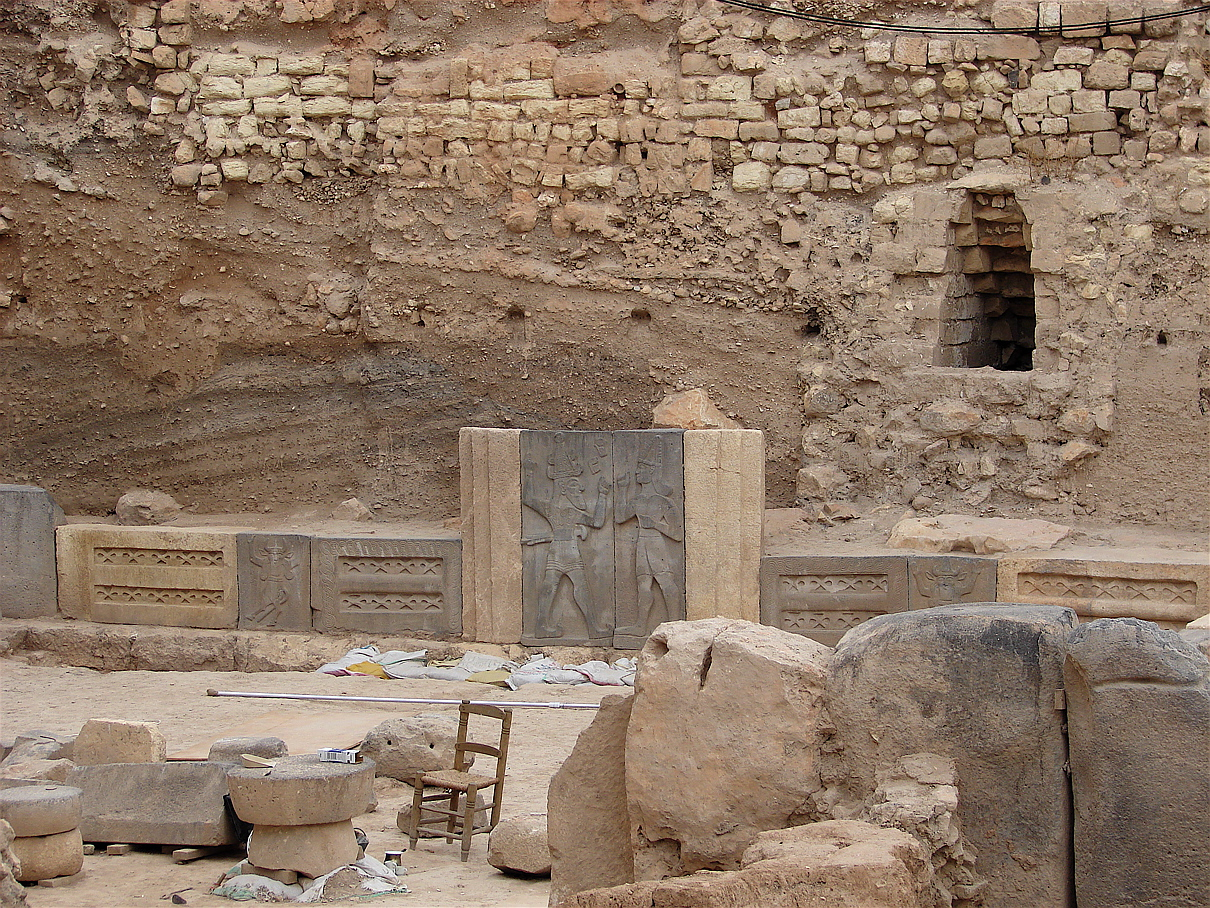
Hadad Temple Inside Aleppo Citadel

Aleppo has scarcely been touched by archaeologists, since the modern city occupies its ancient site.

Throughout its history, Aleppo has been part of the following states:

- c. 2400 BC – mid-23rd century BC, Kingdom of Armi
- mid-23rd century BC – mid-22nd century BC, Akkadian Empire
- 21st century BC – 19th century BC, Eblaite Kingdom
- c. 1800 BC – 1595 BC, Amorite Kingdom of Yamhad
- 1595 BC – c. 1500 BC, Hittite Kingdom
- c. 1500 BC – c. 1450 BC, Mitanni
- c. 1450 BC – c. 1350 BC, New Kingdom of Egypt
- c. 1350 BC – early 12th century BC, Hittite Kingdom
- 11th century BC, Syro-Hittite kingdom of Palistin
- 10th century BC, Syro-Hittite kingdom of Bit Agusi
- 9th century BC – late 7th century BC, Neo-Assyrian Empire
- early 6th century BC – mid-6th century BC, Chaldean Empire
- c. 550 BC – c. 350 BC, Persian Achaemenid Empire
- 333–312 BC, Macedonian Empire
- 312–88 BC, Seleucid Empire
- 88–64 BC, Armenian Empire
- 64–27 BC, Roman Republic
- 27 BC – 395 AD, Roman Empire
- 476–608, Byzantine Empire
- 608–622, Sassanid Persia
- 622–637, Byzantine Empire (restored)
- 637–661, Rashidun Caliphate
- 661–750, Umayyad Caliphate
- 750–878, Abbasid Caliphate
- 878–905, Tulunids
- 905–941, Abbasid Caliphate (restored)
- 941–944, Ikhshidids
- 944–1003, Hamdanids
- 1003–1038, Fatimid Caliphate
- 1038–1080, Mirdasids
- 1080–1086, Uqaylids
- 1086–1118, Seljuq Empire
- 1118–1128, Artuqids
- 1128–1183, Zengids
- 1183–1260, Ayyubids
- 1260 March–October, Mongol Empire
- 1260–1400, Mamluk Sultanate
- 1400 Timurid Empire
- 1400–1516, Mamluk Sultanate (restored)
- 1516–1918, Ottoman Empire
- 1920 March–July, Arab Kingdom of Syria
- 1920–1924, State of Aleppo under the French Mandate
- 1924–1946, French Mandate of Syria
- 1946–1958, Syrian Republic
- 1958–1961, United Arab Republic
- 1961–2024, Ba'athist Syria
- 2024–present, Syria

=== Early Bronze Age ===
==== Early Bronze IV ====
In the Early Bronze IV (c. 2350-2020 BCE), the nature of Aleppo is debated. This period at the end of the EBA was characterized by climate variability and severe droughts at 2210-2130 (4.2 ka event, Fall of the Akkadian Empire in 2154 BCE) and 2036-2023 BCE (Decline and Fall of Ur III in 2004 BCE).

Aleppo appears in historical records as an important city much earlier than Damascus. The first record of Aleppo may be from the third millennium BC if the identification of Aleppo as Armi, a city-state closely related to Ebla is correct. Armi has also been identified with the modern Tell Bazi. Giovanni Pettinato describes Armi as Ebla's alter ego. Naram-Sin of Akkad (or his grandfather Sargon) destroyed both Ebla and Arman in the 23rd century BC.

=== Middle Bronze Age ===
In the Middle Bronze Age (c. 2020-1550 BCE), Aleppo became a dominant regional power in the region.

==== Middle Bronze I ====
In Middle Bronze IA (MB IA, c. 2020-1900 BCE), the region recovered from the Collapse of the Early Bronze Age. In the aftermath, settlement patterns shifted and new centers emerged. Comparison can be made with Ebla Mardikh IIIA1, and Isin-Larsa period in Mesopotamia.

In Middle Bronze IB (MB IB, c. 1900-1820 BCE), the region of Aleppo started to gain a dominant role paving the way for the Great Kingdom of Yamhad in the following MB IIA-period. Comparison can be made with Ebla Mardikh IIIA2.

==== Middle Bronze II ====
In the Middle Bronze IIA (MB IIA, c. 1820-1630 BC), Aleppo was the capital of the Great Kingdom of Yamhad under its Amorite kings Sumu-Epuh (c. 1810 BCE) and Yarim-Lim I. Aleppo reached its peak of power in the first half of the MB IIA, contemporary with famous great kings as Shamshi-Adad I (r. 1808-1775 BCE) of the Kingdom of Upper Mesopotamia and Hammurabi of Babylon (c. 1792-1750 BCE) who built similar great kingdoms in the region. In the second half of the MB IIA (c. 1750-1630 BCE) its power slowly waned along with other regional powers. This corresponds with the Old Babylonian period, when Aleppo's name appears as Ḥalab (Ḥalba) for the first time. The heartland was known as the 'land of Ḥalab', was one of the most powerful kingdoms in the Near East at the time. The king subjugated nearby petty kingdoms becoming a great king with several vassals, controlling centers such as Ebla Mardikh IIIB1, Alalakh, Ugarit, Emar etc. In the south, it was rivalled by the Great Kingdom of Qatna.

In Middle Bronze IIB (MB IIB, c. 1630-1590 BCE), Yamḥad was first attacked by the Hittite king Hattusili I (c. 1620 BCE) and later destroyed by Mursilis I in the 16th century BC. However, Aleppo soon resumed its leading role in Syria when the Hittite power in the region waned due to internal strife. This ended the MBA in Inner Syria (Northern Levant), transitioning into LB IA, while a remnant MB IIC (c. 1590-1550 BCE; Hyksos period) continues further south in the Southern Levant.

==== Late Bronze Age ====
Taking advantage of the power vacuum in the region, Parshatatar, king of the Hurrian kingdom of Mitanni, conquered Aleppo in the 15th century BC. Subsequently, Aleppo found itself on the frontline in the struggle between the Mitanni and the Hittites and Egypt.

The Hittite Suppiluliumas I permanently defeated Mitanni and conquered Aleppo in the 14th century BC. Aleppo had cultic importance to the Hittites for being the center of worship of the Storm-God.

=== Iron Age ===
When the Hittite kingdom collapsed in the 12th century BC, Aleppo became part of the Syro-Hittite kingdom of Palistin, then the Aramaean Syro-Hittite kingdom of Bit Agusi (which had its capital at Arpad), it stayed part of that kingdom until conquered by the Assyrians in the 9th century BC, and became part of the Neo-Assyrian Empire until the late 7th century BC, before passing through the hands of the Neo-Babylonians and the Achaemenid Persians.

=== Classical antiquity ===
Alexander the Great took over the city in 333 BC. Seleucus Nicator established a Hellenic settlement in the site between 301 and 286 BC. He called it Beroea (Βέροια), after Beroea in Macedon.

Northern Syria was the centre of gravity of the Hellenistic colonizing activity, and therefore of Hellenistic culture in the Seleucid Empire. As did other Hellenized cities of the Seleucid kingdom, Beroea probably enjoyed a measure of local autonomy, with a local civic assembly or boulē composed of free Hellenes.

Beroea remained under Seleucid rule for nearly 300 years until the last holdings of the Seleucid dynasty were handed over to Pompey in 64 BC, at which time they became a Roman province. Rome's presence afforded relative stability in northern Syria for over three centuries. Although the province was administered by a legate from Rome, Rome did not impose its administrative organization on the Greek-speaking ruling class.

Beroea is mentioned in 2 Maccabees 13:4.

=== Medieval period and the expansion of the city ===
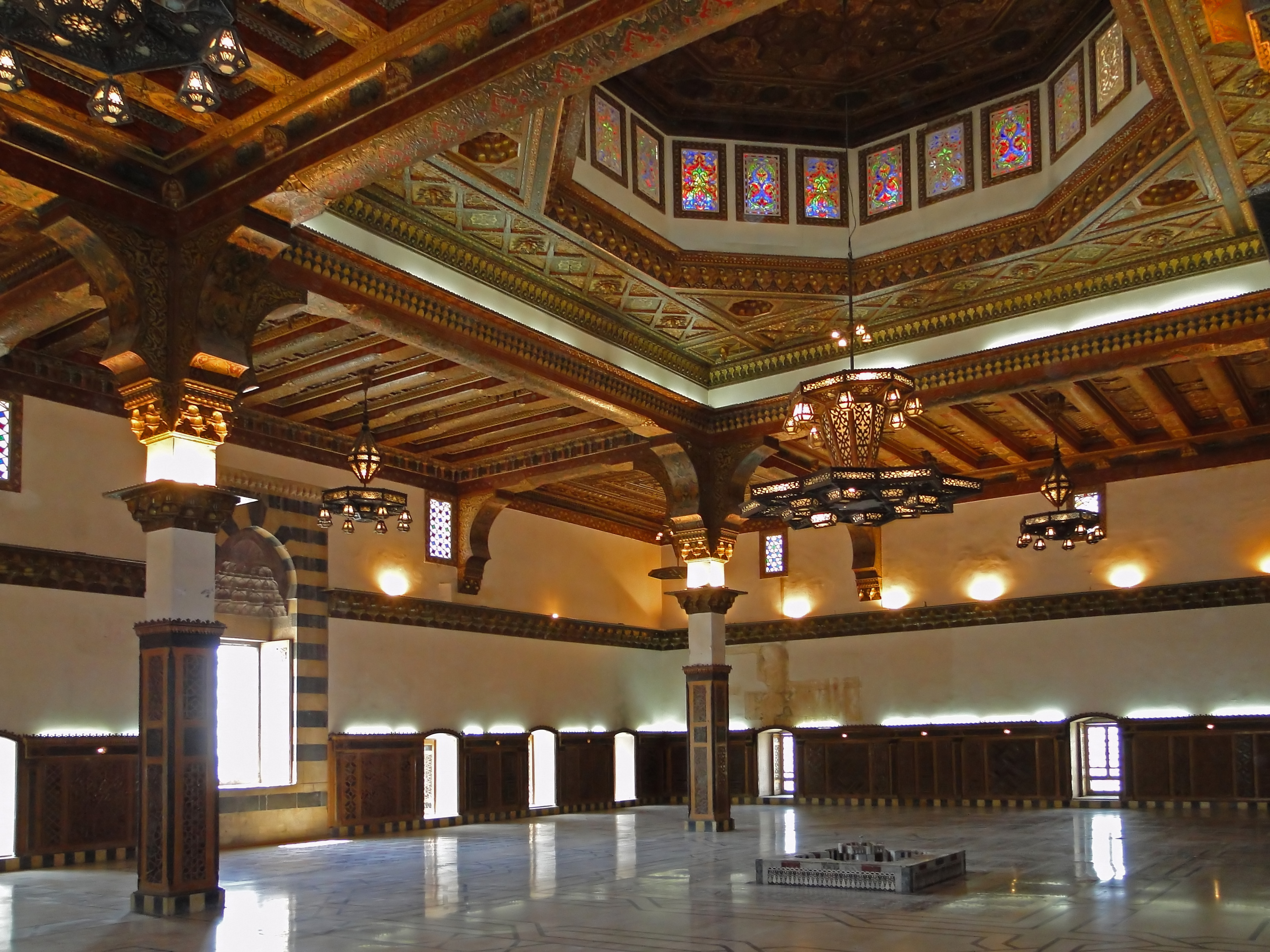
The throne hall of the citadel restored during the Mamluk period

The Sassanid King Khosrow I pillaged and burned Aleppo in 540 CE. Later on, the Sassanid Persians invaded Syria briefly in the early 7th century. Soon after, Aleppo fell to Arab Muslims under Khalid ibn al-Walid in 637. In 944, it became the seat of an independent emirate under the Hamdanid prince Sayf al-Daula, and enjoyed a period of great prosperity.

On 9 August 1138, a deadly earthquake ravaged the city and the surrounding area. Although estimates from this time are very unreliable, it is believed that 230,000 people died, making it the fifth deadliest earthquake in recorded history.

After Tamerlane invaded Aleppo in 1400 and destroyed it, the Christians migrated out of the city walls and established their cell in 1420, at the northwestern suburbs of the city, thus founding the quarters of Jdeydeh. The inhabitants of Jdeydeh were mainly brokers who facilitated trade between foreign traders and local merchants. Many other districts were built outside the historic walls during the 15th and 16th centuries.

Mention is made of the city, by one of the witches, in William Shakespeare's Macbeth, written between 1603 and 1607.

== Main sights ==
Aleppo is characterized by mixed architectural styles, having been ruled, among the other, by Romans, Byzantines, Seljuqs, Mamluks and Ottomans.

Various types of 13th and 14th centuries constructions, such as caravanserais, caeserias, Quranic schools, hammams and religious buildings are found in the old city. The quarters of Jdeydeh district are home to numerous 16th and 17th-century houses of the Aleppine bourgeoisie, featuring stone engravings.

=== Souqs and Khans ===
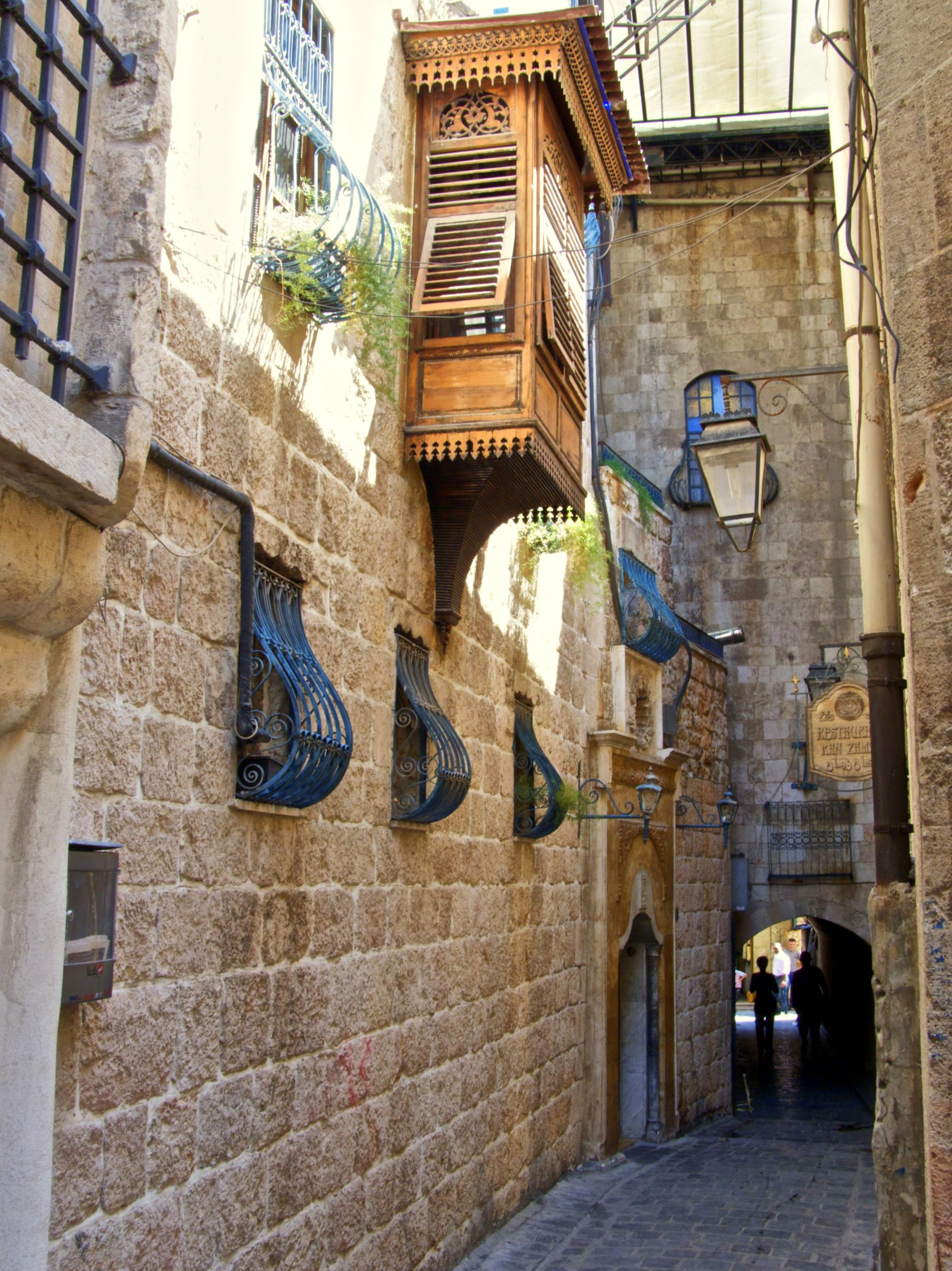
Bawabet al-Yasmin near the wool market, Jdeideh

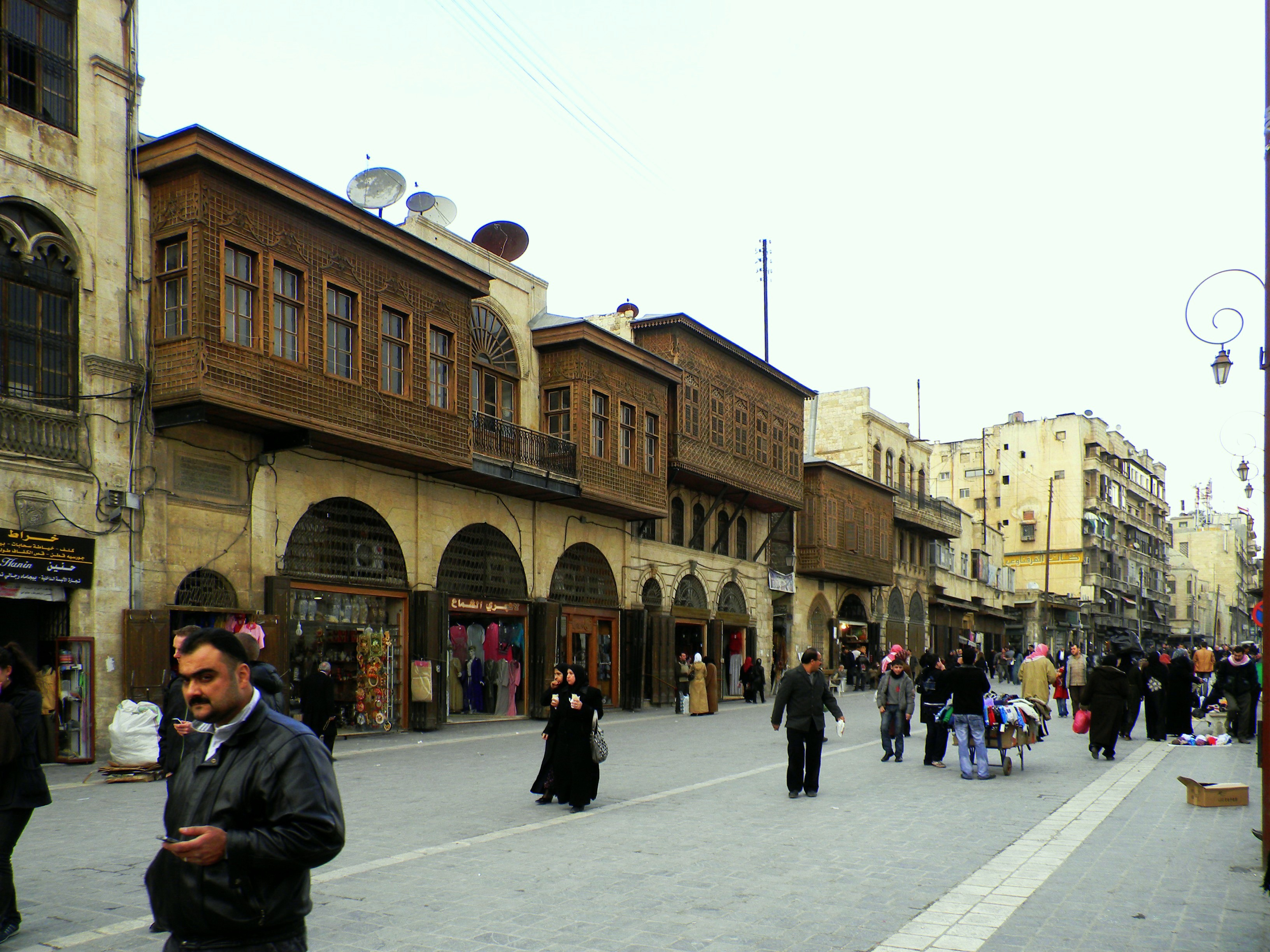
Ancient Aleppo, the entrance to Al-Madina Souq

The city's strategic trading position attracted settlers of all races and beliefs who wished to take advantage of the commercial roads that met in Aleppo from as far as China and Mesopotamia to the east, Europe to the west, and the Fertile Crescent and Egypt to the south. The largest covered souq-market in the world is in Aleppo, with an approximate length of 13 kilometres (8.1 miles).

Al-Madina Souq, as it is locally known, is an active trade centre for imported luxury goods, such as raw silk from Iran, spices and dyes from India, and coffee from Damascus. Souq al-Madina is also home to local products such as wool, agricultural products and soap. Most of the souqs date back to the 14th century and are named after various professions and crafts, hence the wool souq, the copper souq, and so on. Aside from trading, the souq accommodated the traders and their goods in khans (caravanserais) and scattered in the souq. Other types of small market-places were called caeserias (قيساريات). Caeserias are smaller than khans in their sizes and functioned as workshops for craftsmen. Most of the khans took their names after their location in the souq and function, and are characterized with their beautiful façades and entrances with fortified wooden doors.

The most significant khans within and along the covered area of Souq al-Madina are: Khan al-Qadi from 1450, Khan al-Saboun from the early 16th century, Khan al-Nahhaseen from 1539, Khan al-Shouneh from 1546, Khan al-Jumrok from 1574, Souq Khan al-Wazir from 1682, Souq al-Farrayin, Souq al-Dira', Souq al-Hiraj, Souq al-Attarine, Souq az-Zirb, Souq Marcopoli, Souq as-Siyyagh, The Venetians' Khan,*Souq Khan al-Harir from the second half of the 16th century, Suweiqa, etc.

Other traditional souqs and khans in Jdeydeh quarter (outside the walled city):

- Souq al-Hokedun or "Khan al-Quds". Hokedun means "the spiritual house" in Armenian, as it was built to serve as a settlement for the Armenian pilgrims on their way to Jerusalem. The old part of the Hokedun dates back to the late 15th and early 16th centuries while the newer part was built during the 17th century. Nowadays, it is turned into a big souq with a large number of stores specialized in garment trade.
- Souq as-Souf or the wool market, located at Salibeh street, surrounded with the old churches of the quarter.
- Bawabet al-Qasab, a trade centre for wooden products.
Al-Madina Souq
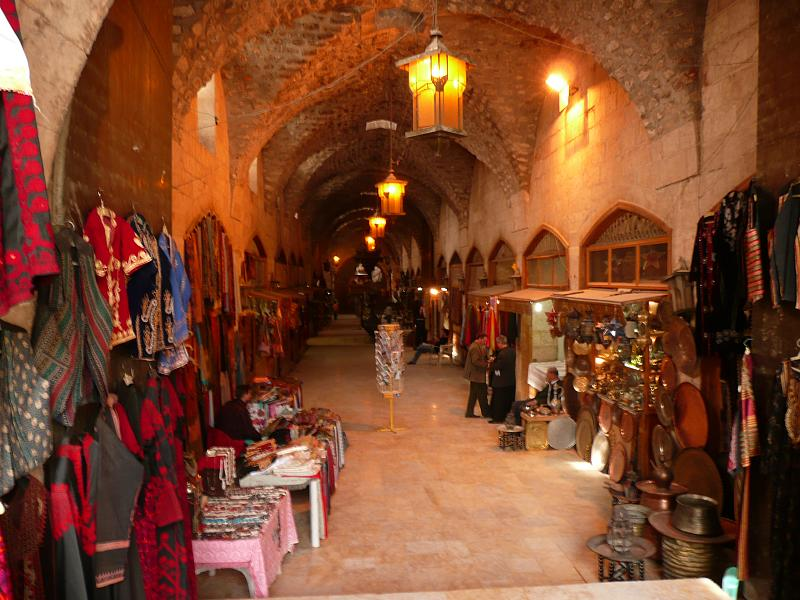
Khan al-Shouneh

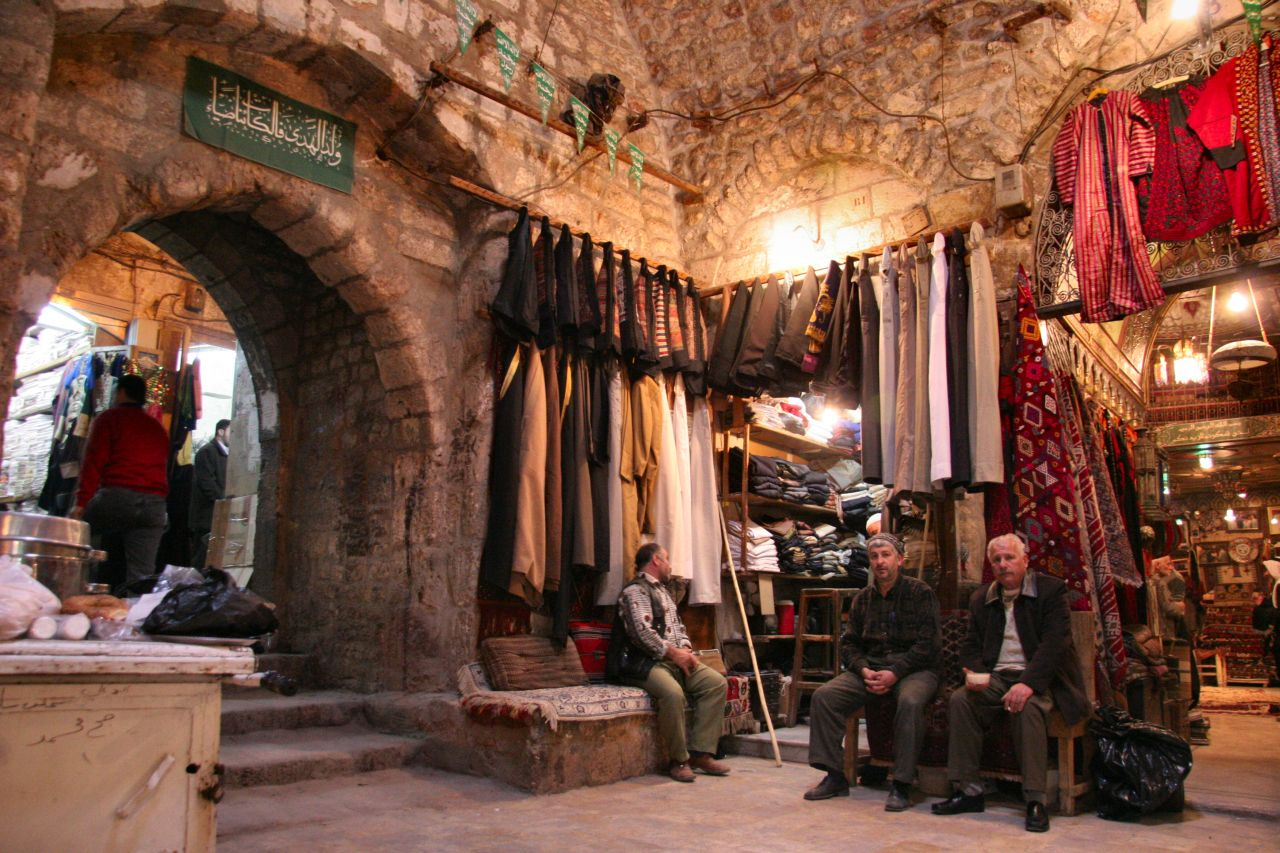
Souq al-Hiraj

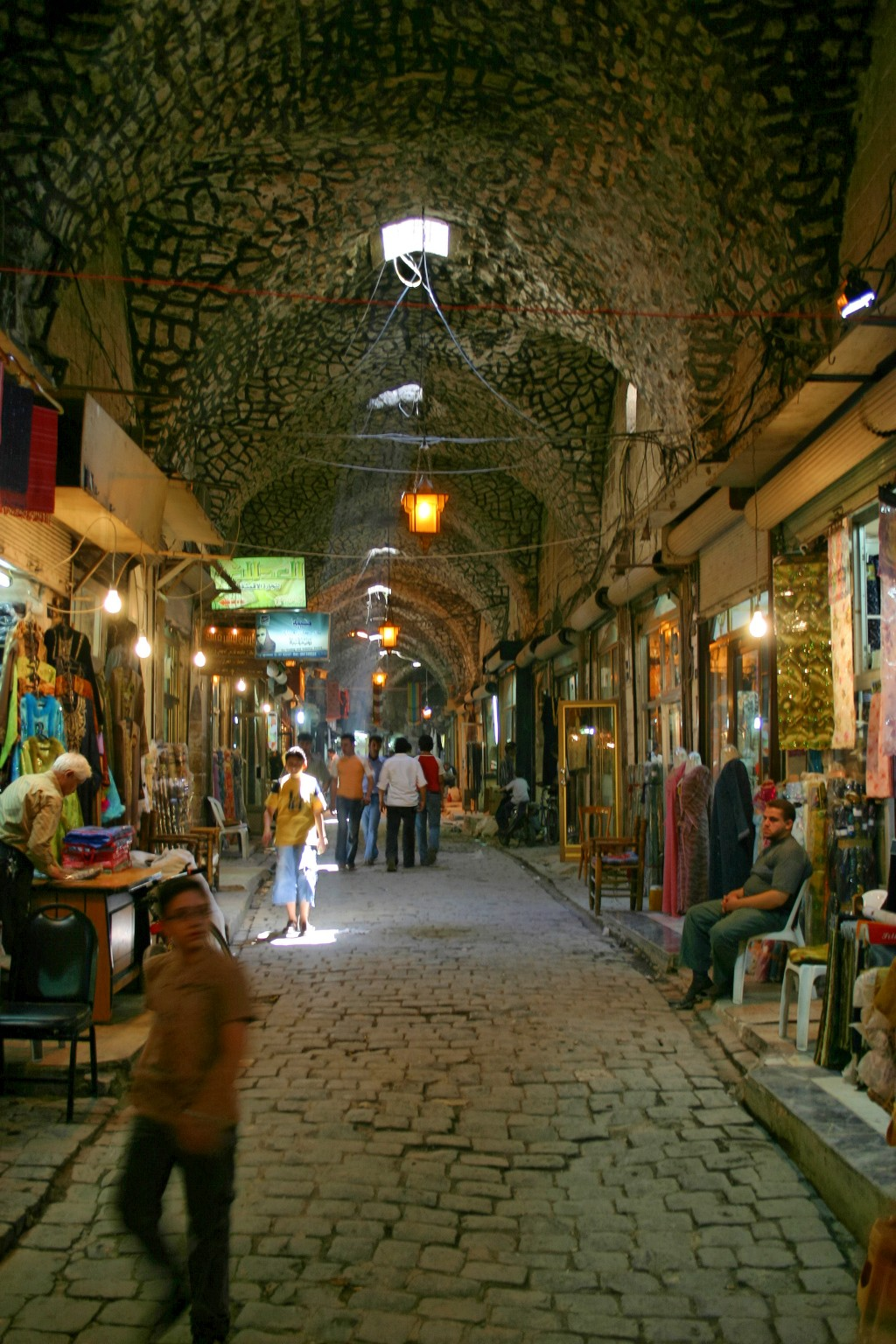
Souq al-'Atmah

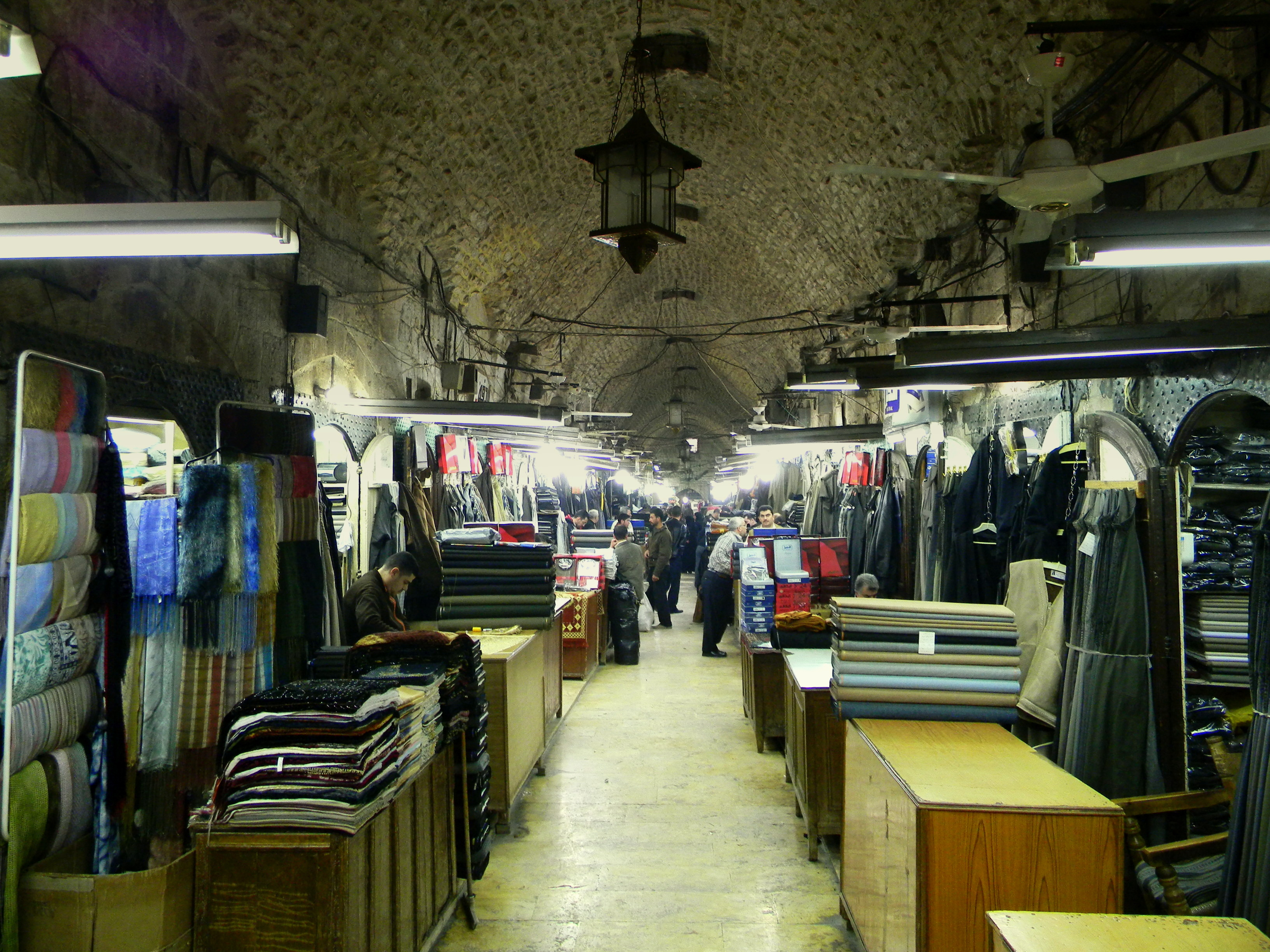
Souq al-Dira'

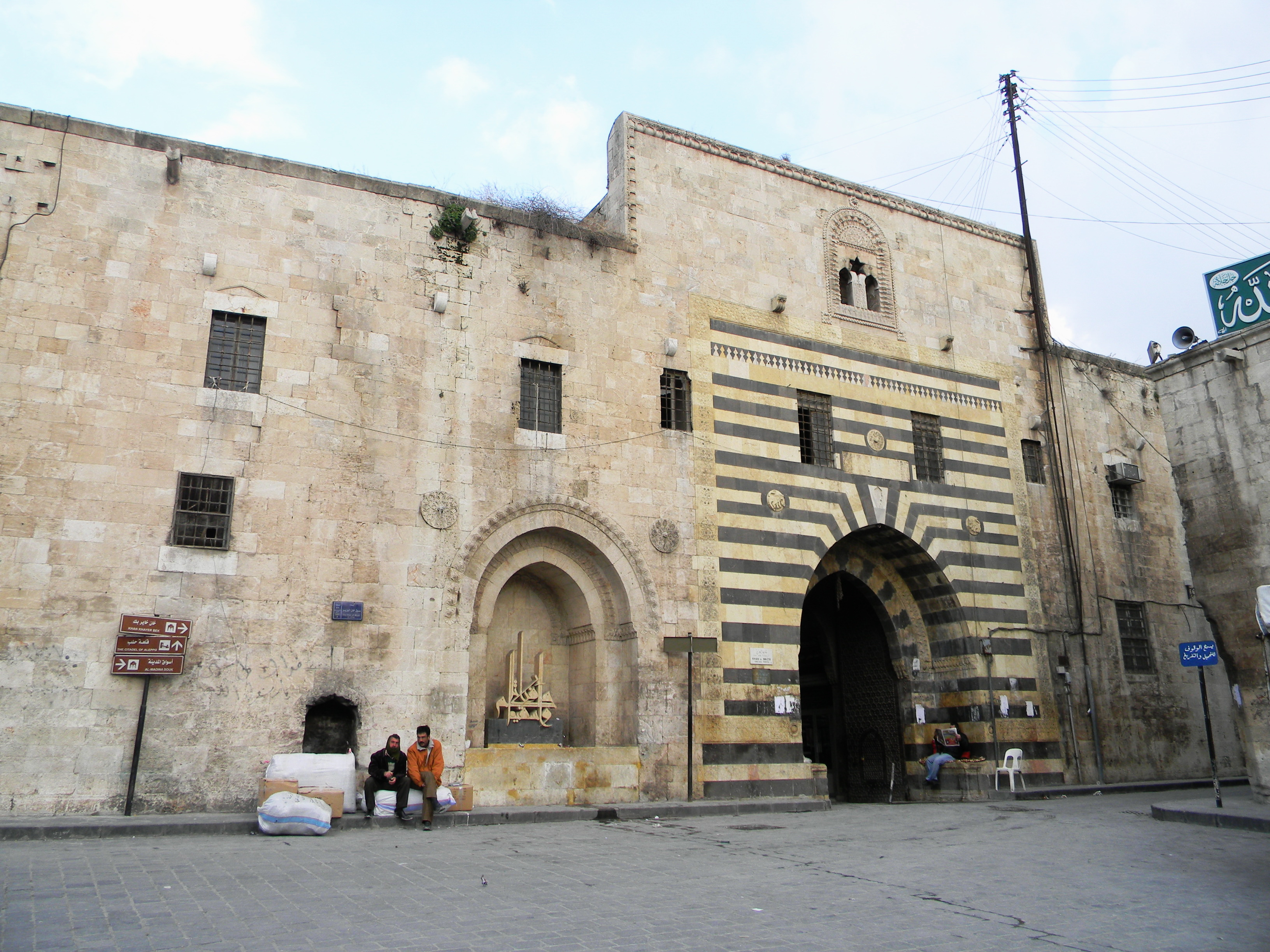
Khan al-Wazir

=== Historic buildings ===
The most significant historic buildings of the ancient city include:

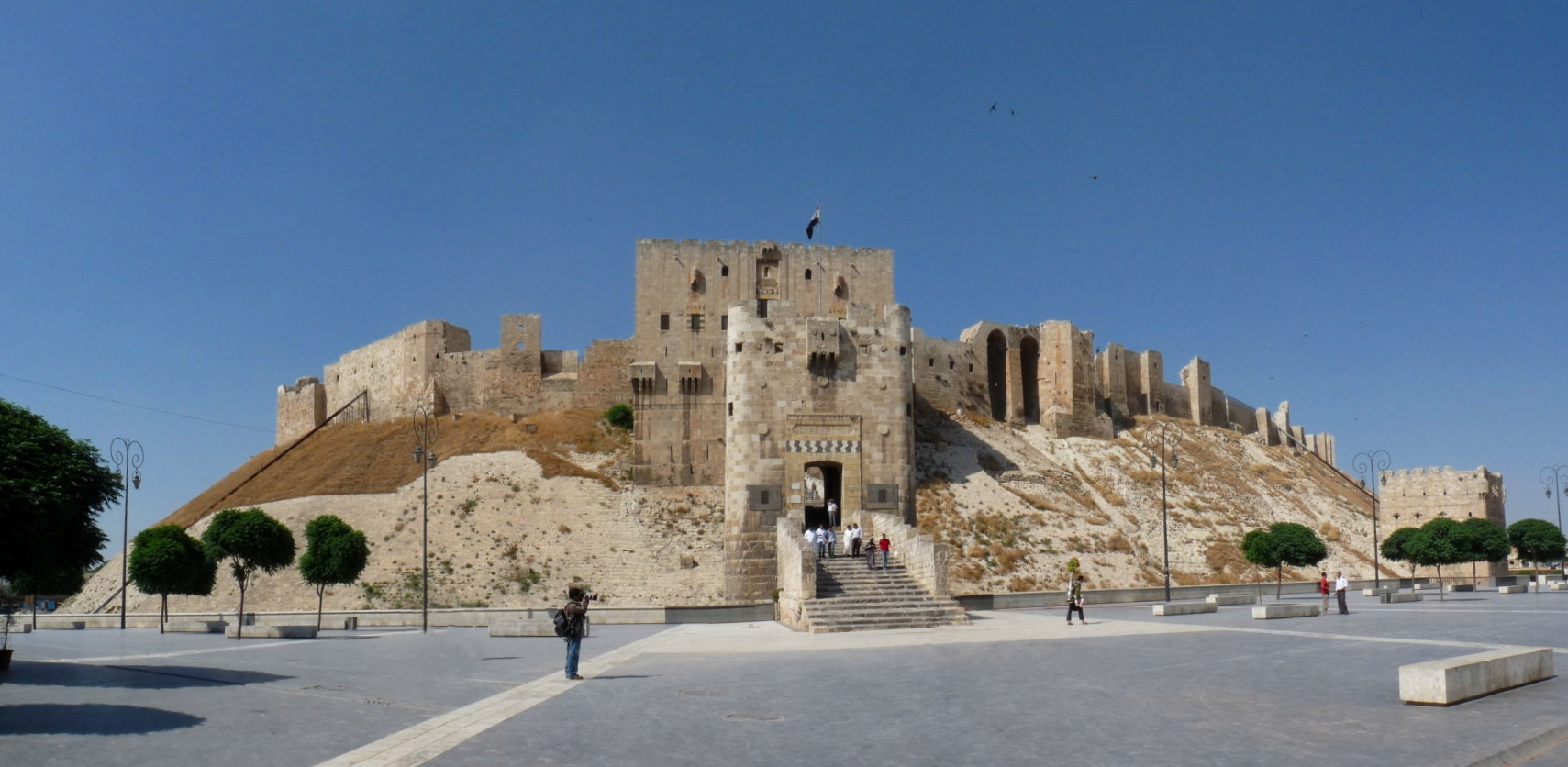
Aleppo Citadel

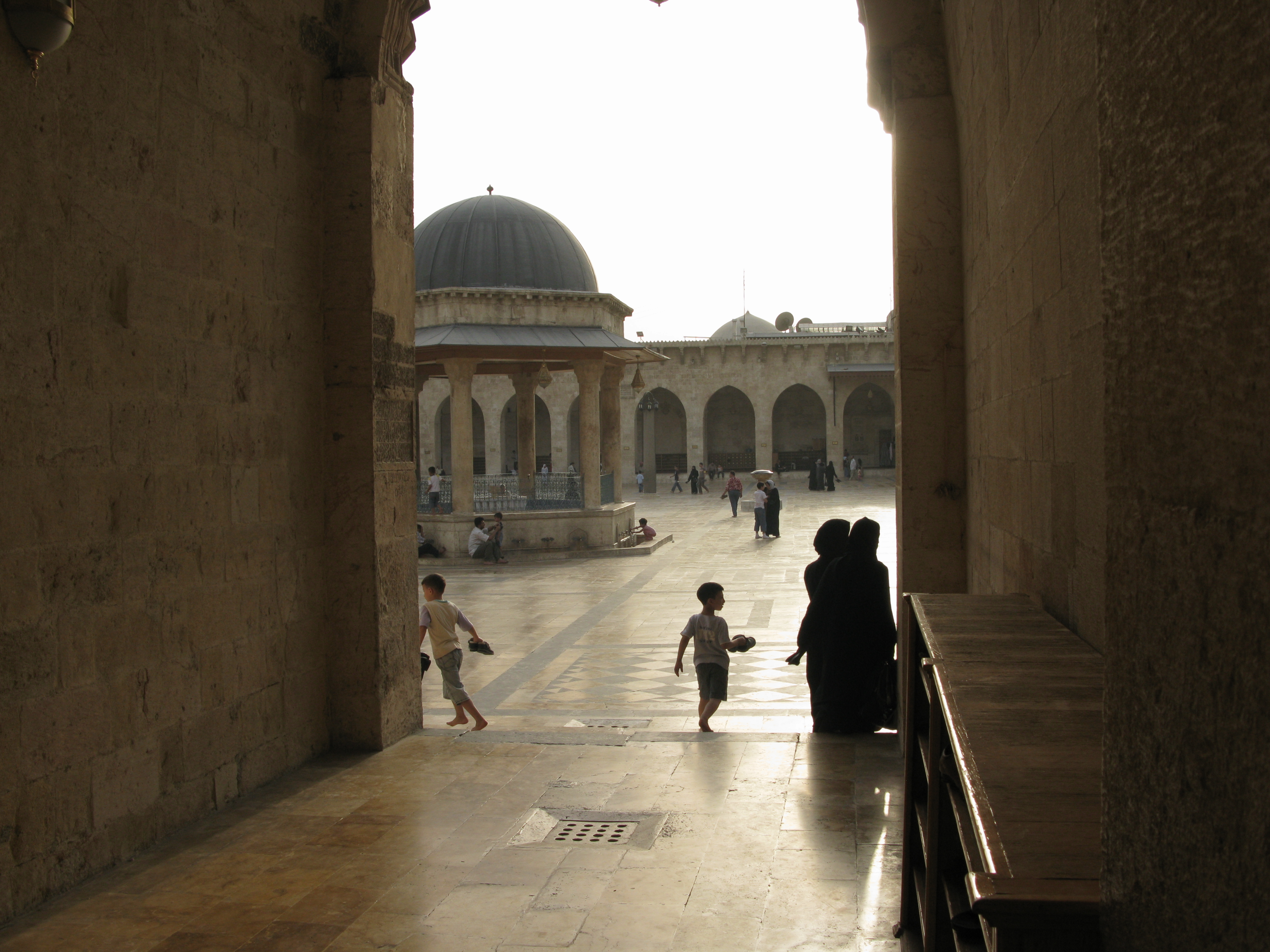
Great Mosque of Aleppo

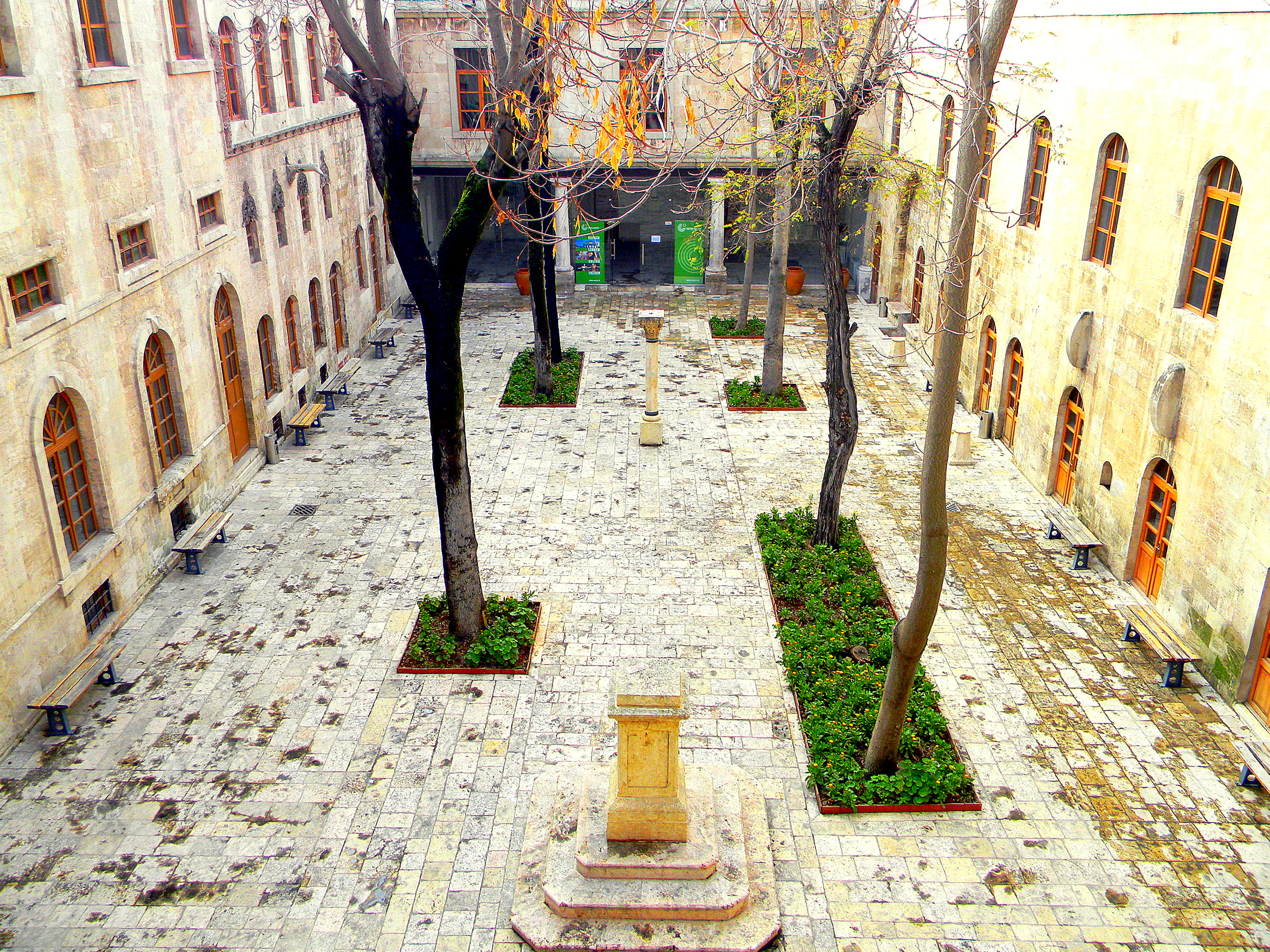
Al-Shibani Church-School

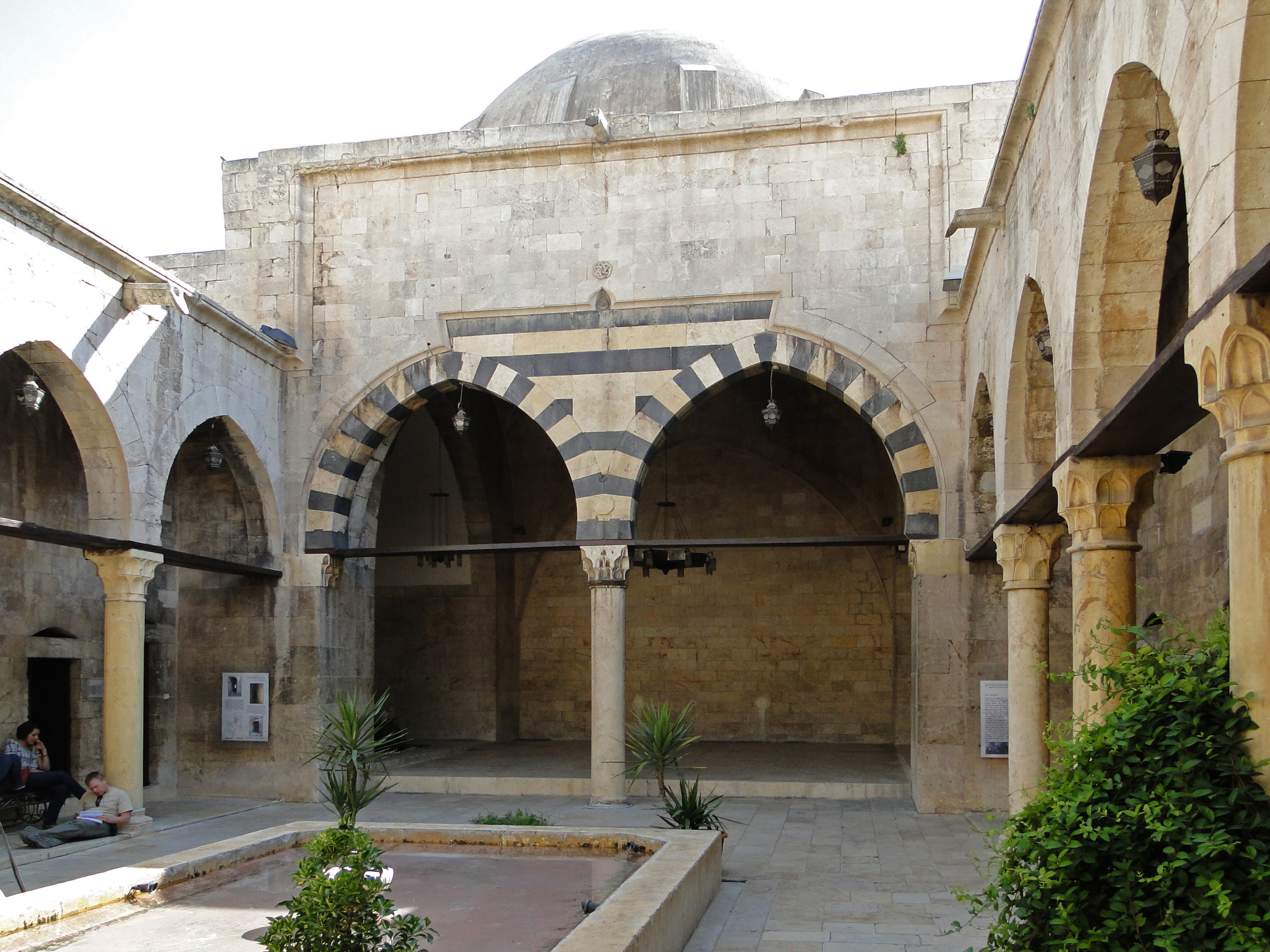
Bimaristan Arghun al-Kamili, 1354

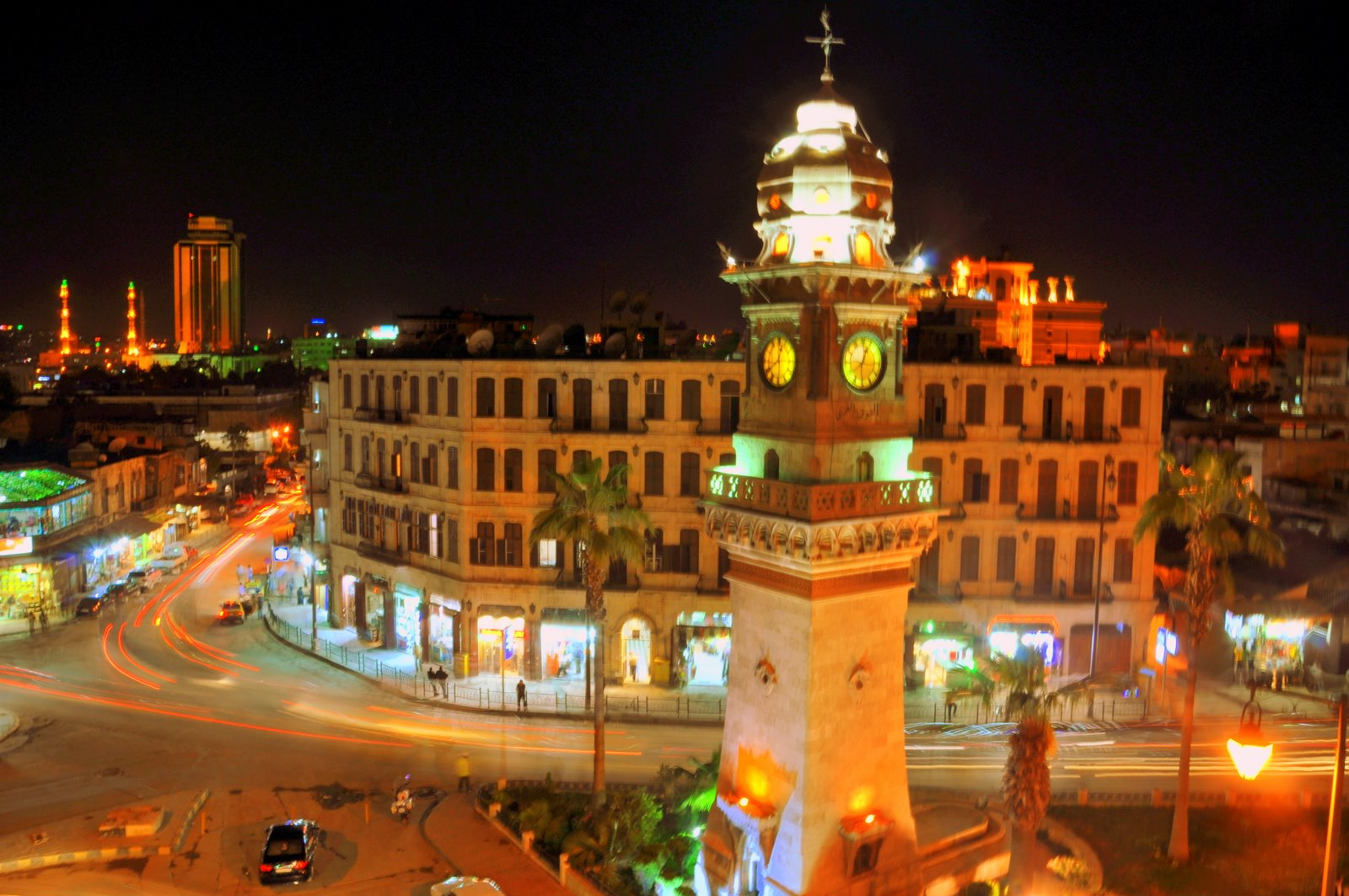
Bab al-Faraj Clock Tower

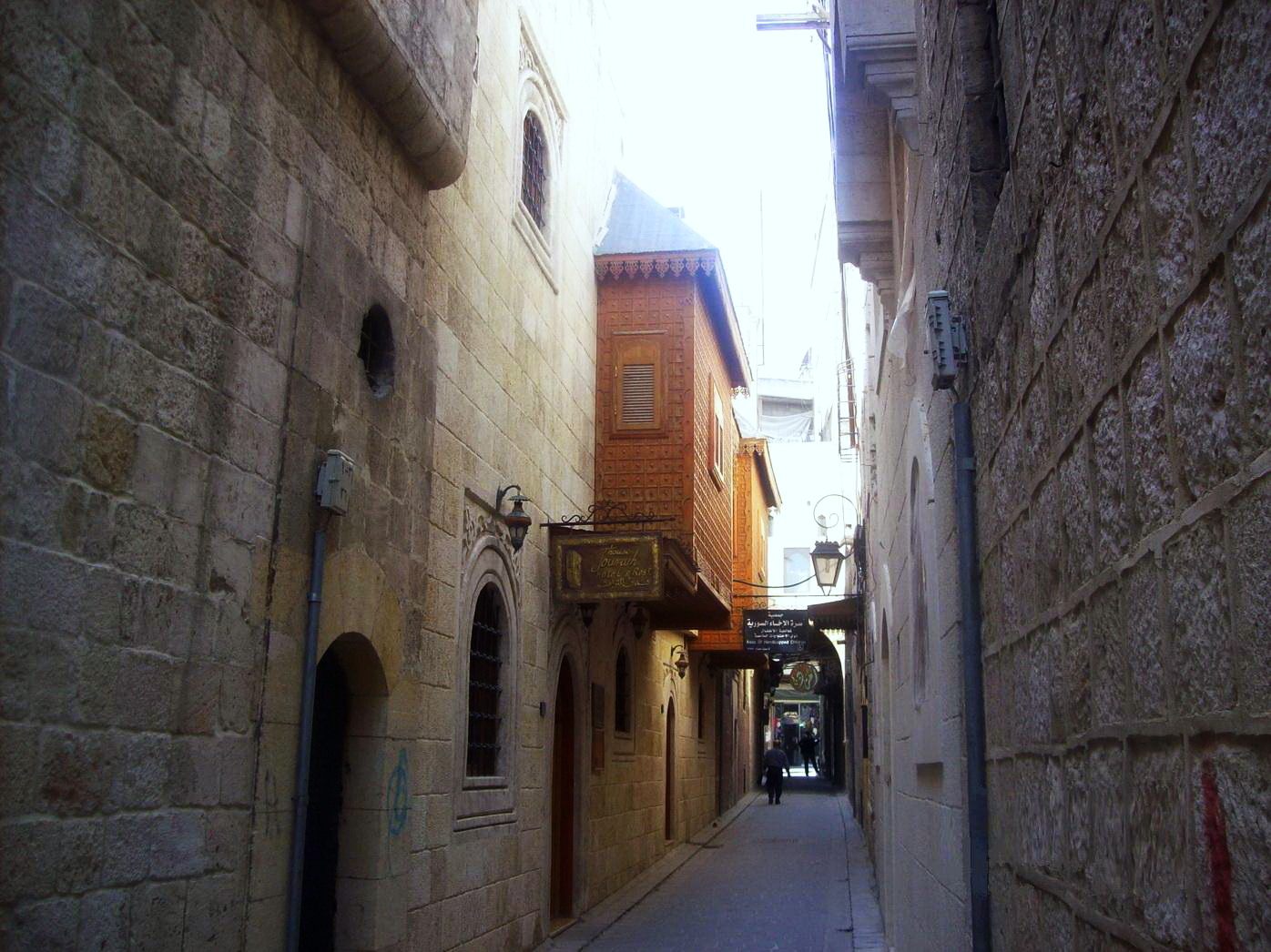
Dar Basile alley in Jdeydeh, 18th century

- The Citadel, a large fortress built atop a huge, partially artificial mound rising 50 m (164 ft) above the city, dates back to the first millennium BC. Recent excavations unearthed a temple and 25 statues dating back to the first millennium BC. Many of the current structures date from the 13th century. The Citadel was extensively damaged by earthquakes, notably during the 1822 Aleppo earthquake.
- Al-Matbakh al-Ajami, an early 12th-century palace located near the citadel, built by the Zengid emir Majd ad-Din bin ad-Daya. The building was renovated during the 15th century. It was the home of the Popular Traditions Museum between 1967–1975.
- Al-Shibani Church-School of the 12th century, an old church and school of the Franciscan Missionaries of Mary located in the old city, currently used as a cultural centre.
- Khanqah al-Farafira, a 13th-century sufi monastery built in 1237 by Dayfa Khatun.
- Bimaristan Arghun al-Kamili, an asylum functioned from 1354 until the early 20th century.
- Dar Rajab Pasha, a large mansion built during the 16th century near al-Khandaq street. During the first decade of the 21st century, the house was renovated and turned into an important cultural centre with a nearby large theatre hall.
- Junblatt Palace, built during the 2nd half of the 16th century by the emir of Kurds in Aleppo and the founder of the Janpolad (Jumblatt) family; Janpolad bek ibn Qasim.
- Beit Marrash, an old Aleppine mansion located in al-Farafira quarter, built at the end of the 18th century by the Marrash family.
- Bab al-Faraj Clock Tower, built in 1898–1899 by the Austrian architect Chartier.
- Grand Serail d'Alep, the former seat of the governor of Aleppo, built during the 1920s and opened in 1933.
- National Library of Aleppo, built during the 1930s and opened in 1945.

The most significant historic buildings of Jdeydeh Christian quarter include:

- Beit Wakil, an Aleppine mansion built in 1603, with unique wooden decorations. One of its decorations was taken to Berlin and exhibited in Pergamon Museum, known as the Aleppo Room. It was originally constructed as a private residence but served various functions over the centuries, including as an orphanage, a restaurant, and a hotel, after being handed over to the Greek Orthodox Church. During the Syrian Civil War, the mansion suffered severe damage from shelling and bombings. In the aftermath, the building underwent a restoration project led by architects Sozdar Abdo, Dima Dayoub, and Rama Omar, with support from international organizations such as the Gerda Henkel Foundation. Once the restoration is complete, Bayt Wakil is set to become a community space, possibly featuring a café or cultural venue.
- Beit Ghazaleh, an old 17th-century mansion characterized with fine decorations, carved by the Armenian sculptor Khachadur Bali in 1691. It was used as an Armenian elementary school during the 20th century.
- Dar Zamaria, built at the end of the 17th century and owned by Zamaria family since the early 18th century. Nowadays, the house is turned into a boutique hotel.
- Beit Achiqbash, an old Aleppine house built in 1757. The building is home to the Popular Traditions Museum since 1975, showing fine decorations of the Aleppine art.
- Dar Basile, an early 18th-century Aleppine house, operating as a private school since 2001.
- Beit Dallal or Dallal House, built in 1826 on the place of an old church and a monastery, nowadays operating as a boutique hotel.

=== Madrasas ===
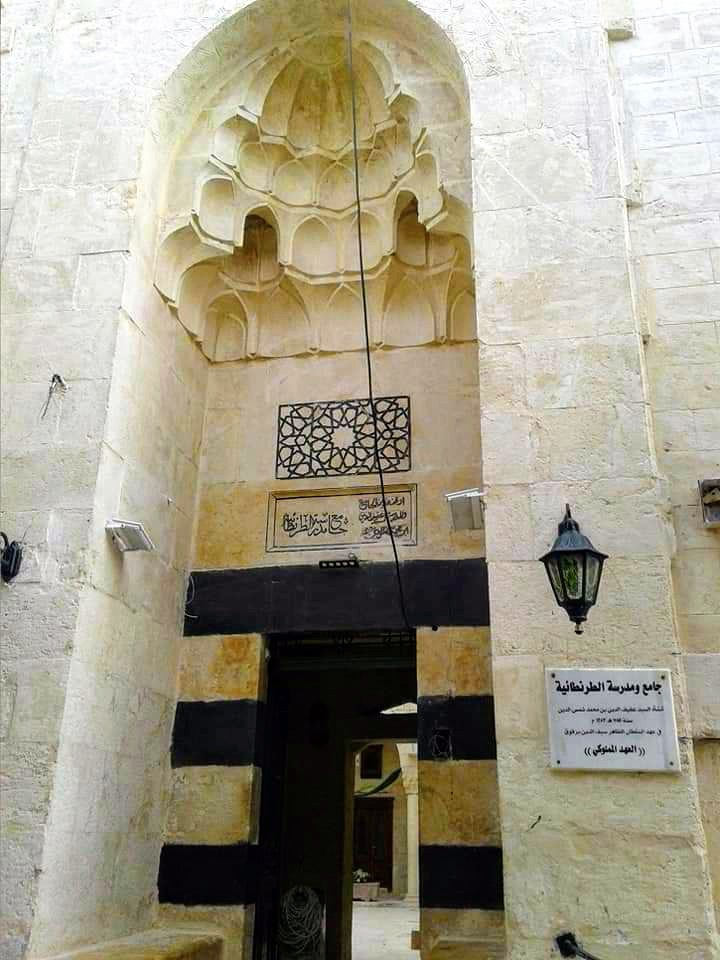
Al-Turantaiyah Madrasa

- Al-Halawiyah Madrasa, built in 1124 on the site of Aleppo's 5th century Great Byzantine Cathedral of Saint Helena, where, according to tradition, a Roman temple once stood. Saint Helena, mother of Constantine the Great, built a great Byzantine cathedral here. When the Crusaders were pillaging the surrounding countryside, the city's chief judge converted the cathedral into a mosque. In 1149, Nur al-Din converted it into a madrasah; an Islamic-religious school. Nowadays, the 6th century Byzantine columns of the old cathedral can be seen in the hall.
- Al-Muqaddamiyah Madrasa, located in the Khan al-Tutun alley, was originally a church before 1123. It was converted into a mosque by the judge of Aleppo Ibn-Khashab, then into a madrasah in 1168 by Izz Eddin Abdal Malek al-Muqadam during Nur al-Din's reign. It is the oldest operating madrasah in Aleppo.
- Al-Shadbakhtiyah Madrasa, one of the earliest preserved Ayyubid madrasas, built in 1193 by Jamal al-Din Shadbakht, a freed slave of Zengid ruler Nur al-Din.
- Al-Zahiriyah Madrasa, built in 1217 outside the city walls to the south of Bab al-Maqam, by Az-Zahir Ghazi.
- Al-Sultaniyah Madrasa, begun by Aleppo governor Az-Zahir Ghazi and completed between 1223–1225 by his son Malek al-Aziz Mohammed. The building is most famous for the mirhab of the prayer room. It contains the tomb of sultan Malik al-Zaher the son of Ayyubid Sultan Saladin.
- Al-Firdaws Madrasa, defined as "the most beautiful of the mosques of Aleppo". It was built outside the city walls to the southwest of Bab al-Maqam gate, by Dayfa Khatun; the widow of governor Az-Zahir Ghazi in 1235–1236, then regent for the Ayyubid ruler An-Nasir Yusuf. It is known for its large iwan (courtyard) with a pool in the middle surrounded by arches and ancient columns, sporting capitals with a honeycomb pattern. The same style characterizes the domes of the prayer hall. The mihrab is made of veined white marble, red porphyry and green diorite.
- Al-Kamiliyah Madrasa, built between 1230–37 outside the city walls by Fatima Khatun daughter of Ayyubid Sultan al-Malik al-Kamil.
- Al-Sharafiyah Madrasa, located to the northeast of the Great Mosque, founded by Abd al-Rahim ibn al-'Ajami and his son Sharaf al-Din 'Abdul Rahman in 1242.
- Al-Turantaiyah Madrasa, located outside the city walls to the east of Bab al-Nairab, built between 1241–51 by the Aleppine historian Ibn al-Udaym.
- Al-Ahmadiyah Madrasa, opened in 1724 in al-Jalloum district. It has an architectural style of Tekyes structures.
- Al-Uthmaniyah Madrasa, located near Bab al-Nasr, founded by the Ottoman pasha Al-Duraki in 1730, and was originally named Madrasa Ridaiya.

=== Places of worship ===
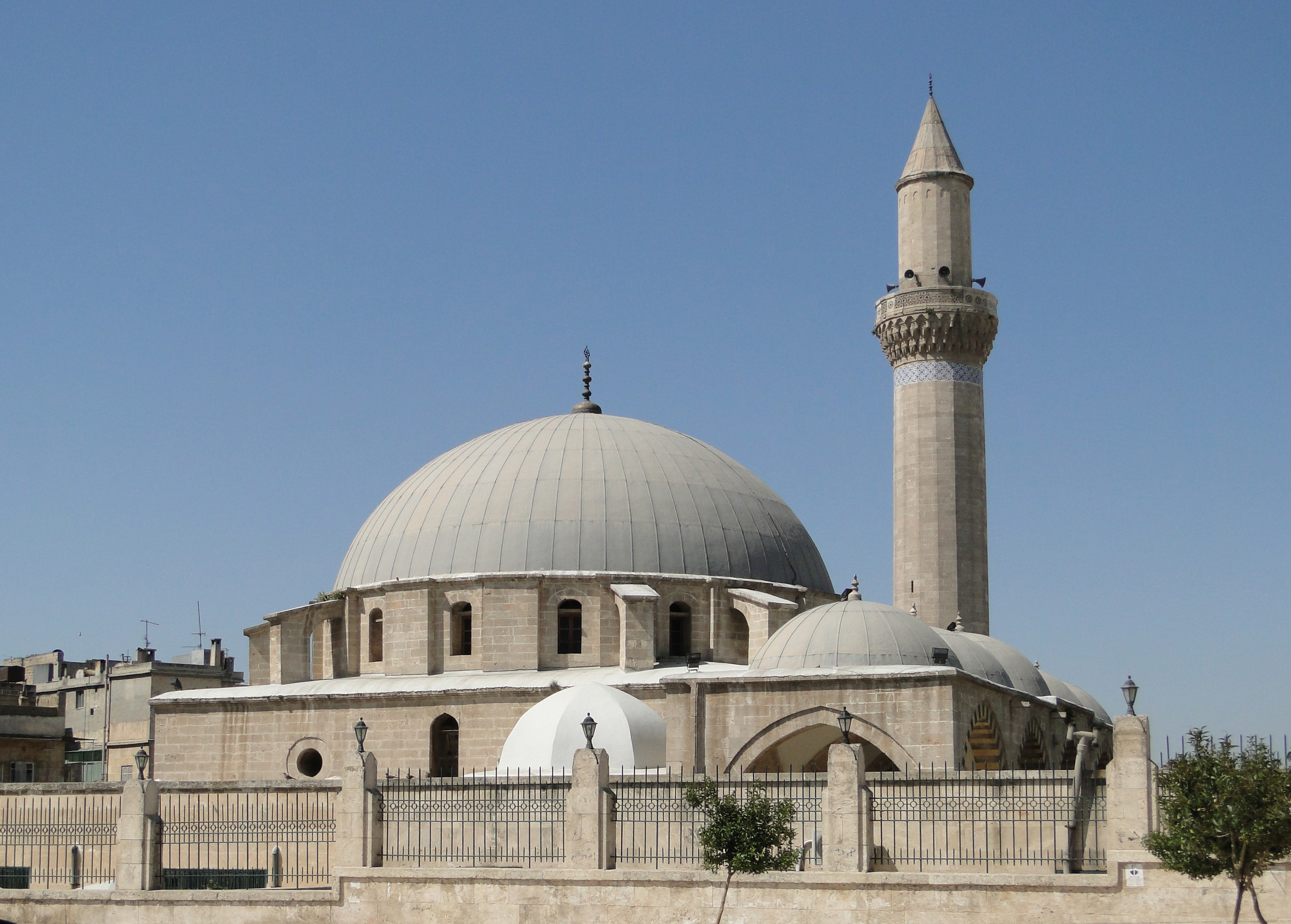
Khusruwiyah Mosque

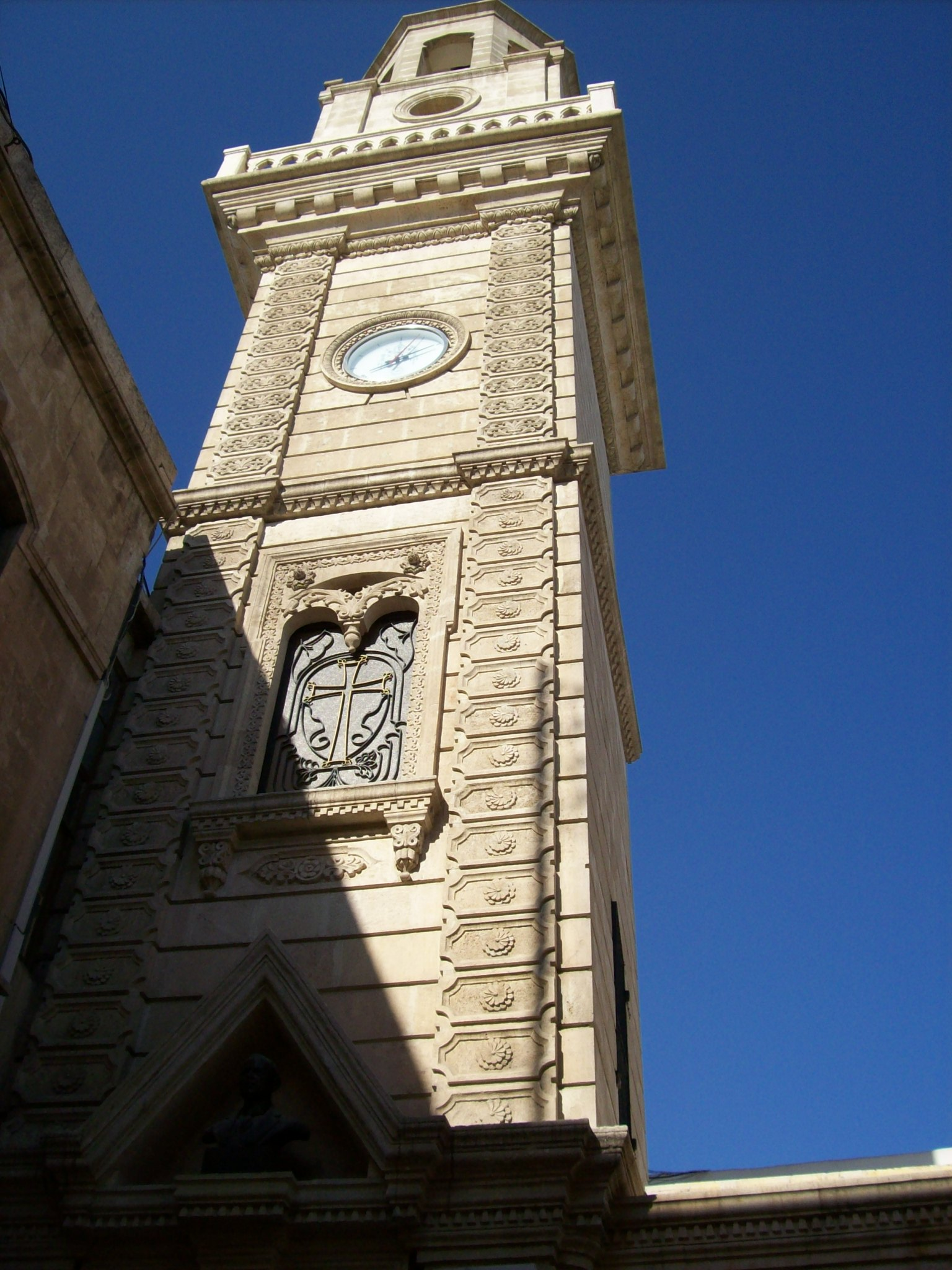
Forty Martyrs Armenian Cathedral

- Great Mosque of Aleppo (Jāmi‘ Bani Omayya al-Kabīr), founded c. 715 by Umayyad caliph Walid I and most likely completed by his successor Sulayman. The building contains a tomb associated with Zachary, father of John the Baptist. Construction of the present structure for Nur al-Din commenced in 1158. However, it was damaged during the Mongol invasion of 1260, and was rebuilt. The 45-metre-high (148 ft) tower (described as "the principal monument of medieval Syria") was erected in 1090–1092 under the first Seljuk sultan, Tutush I. It has four façades with different styles.
- Al-Shuaibiyah Mosque, also known as al-Omari, al-Tuteh and al-Atras mosque. The building was constructed by Nur al-Din in 1150–1. It is known for its 12th century kufic inscriptions and decorations.
- Al-Qaiqan Mosque ("Mosque of the Crows") of the 12th century, decorated with two ancient columns in basalt at the entrance. On the walls of the mosque, a stone block with an Anatolian hieroglyphs inscription could be seen.
- Altun Bogha Mosque of the Mamluk era, built in 1318.
- Al-Sahibiyah Mosque of 1350, built adjacent to Khan al-Wazir.
- Al-Tawashi Mosque built in 1398 and restored in 1537. It has a great façade decorated with colonnettes.
- Al-Otrush Mosque, built in 1398 in Mamluk style. It is famous for its decorated façade and the entrance which is topped with traditional Islamic muqarnas. It was restored in 1922.
- Al-Saffahiyah Mosque, erected in 1425 and partly renovated in 1925. It is famous for its preciously decorated octagonal minaret.
- Khusruwiyah Mosque completed in 1547, designed by the famous Ottoman architect Mimar Sinan.
- Al-Adiliyah Mosque, built in 1557 by the Ottoman governor of Aleppo Muhammed Pasha. It has a prayer hall preceded by an arcade, with a dome, a mihrab with local faience tiles.
- The old church of the Holy Mother of God of the Armenian Apostolic Church at Jdeydeh quarter, built before 1429.
- The Forty Martyrs Armenian Apostolic cathedral of 1429, located in Jdeydeh quarter.
- Mar Assia al-Hakim Church Syrian Catholic church of the 15th century in Jdeydeh.
- The Dormition of Our Lady Greek Orthodox church of the 15th century in Jdeydeh.
- Churches of Jdeydeh Christian quarter such as the Maronite Saint Elias Cathedral, the Armenian Catholic Cathedral of Our Mother of Reliefs and the Melkite Greek Catholic Cathedral of Virgin Mary.
- The Central Synagogue of Aleppo or al-Bandara synagogue, completed as early as the 9th century by the efforts of the Jewish community. The synagogue was ruined several times until 1428 when it was restored. The Jewish quarter collapsed during the 1822 Aleppo earthquake. Recently, the building was renovated by the efforts of Aleppine Jewish migrants in the United States.

=== Gates ===
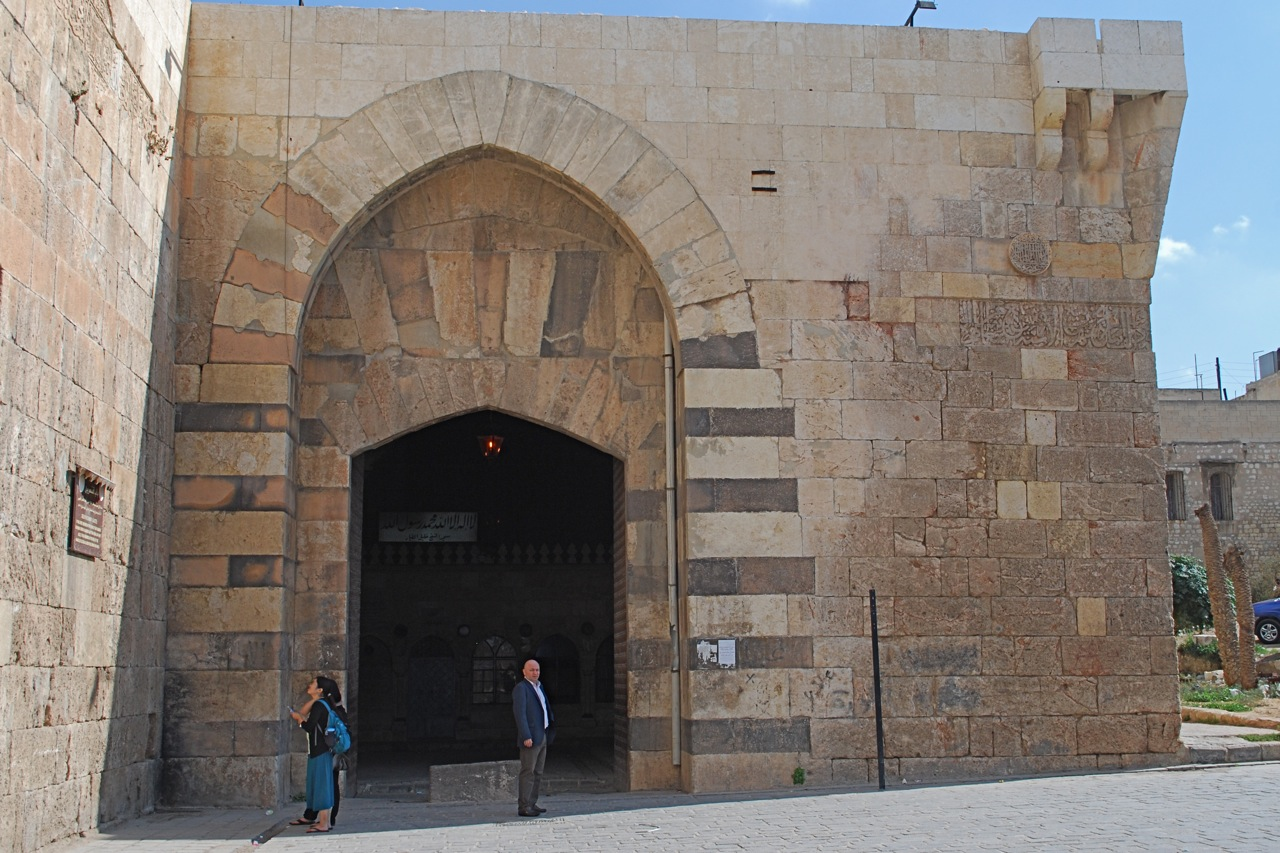
Aleppo city walls and the Gate of Qinnasrin, restored in 1256 by An-Nasir Yusuf

The old part of the city is surrounded with 5-kilometre-long (3.1-mile) thick walls, pierced by the nine historical gates (many of them are well-preserved) of the old town. These are, clockwise from the north-east of the citadel:

- Bab al-Hadid (Iron Gate)
- Bab al-Ahmar (Red Gate, completely ruined)
- Bab al-Nairab (Gate of Nairab, completely ruined)
- Bab al-Maqam (Gate of the Shrine)
- Bab Qinnasrin (Gate of Qinnasrin)
- Bab Antakeya (Gate of Antioch)
- Bāb Jnēn (Gate of Gardens, completely ruined)
- Bab al-Faraj (Gate of Deliverance, completely ruined)
- Bab al-Nasr (Victory Gate, partially ruined)

=== Hammams ===
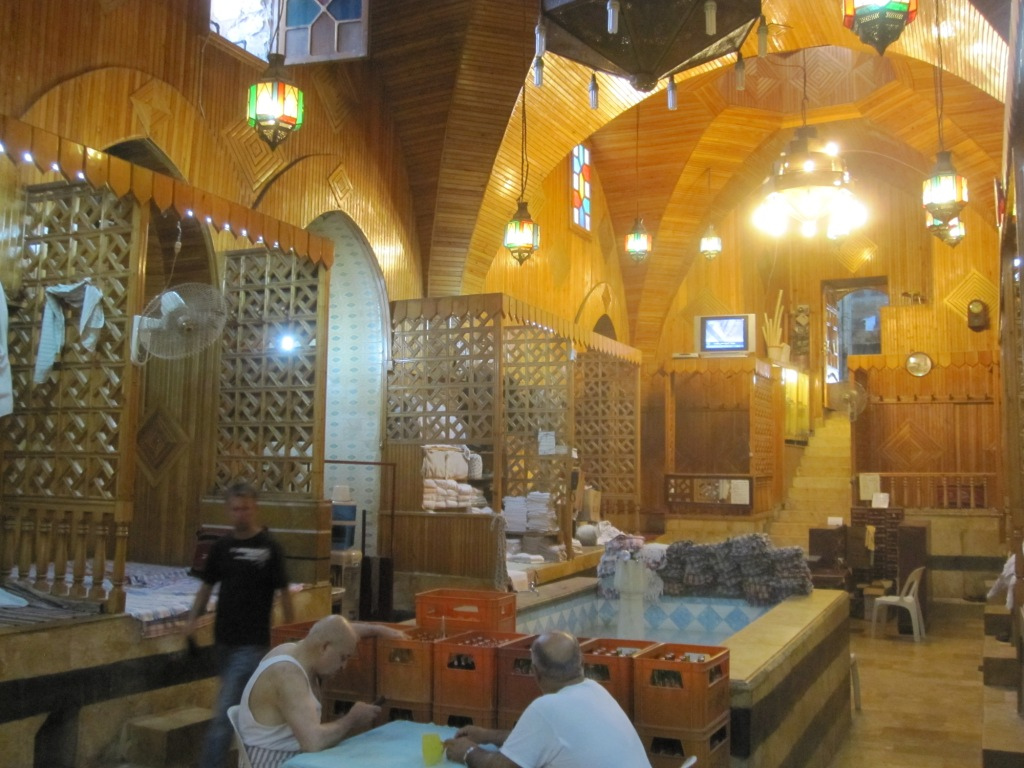
Hammam al-Nahhasin

Aleppo was home to 177 hammams during the medieval period, until the Mongol invasion when many vital structures in the city were destroyed. Nowadays, roughly 18 hammams are operating in the old city.

- Hammam al-Sultan built in 1211 by Az-Zahir Ghazi.
- Hammam al-Nahhasin built during the 12th century near Khan al-Nahhasin.
- Hammam Bab al-Ahmar built by Ottomans.
- Hammam al-Bayadah of the Mamluk era built in 1450.
- Hammam Yalbugha built in 1491 by the Emir of Aleppo Saif ad-Din Yalbugha al-Naseri.
- Hammam al-Jawhary, hammam Azdemir, hammam Bahram Pasha, etc.

== Districts and subdivisions ==
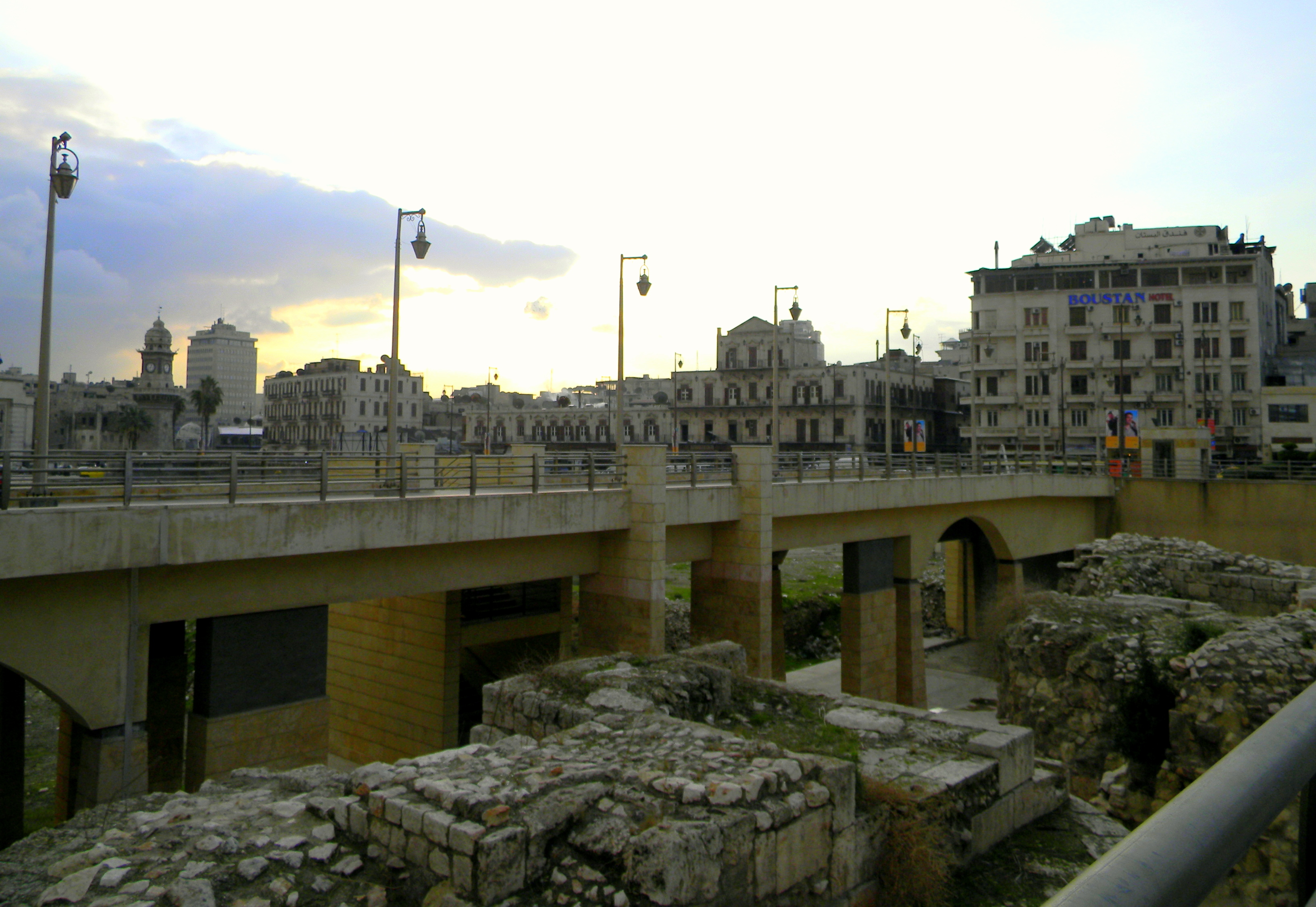
The remains of the old walls at the entrance to Bab Al-Faraj

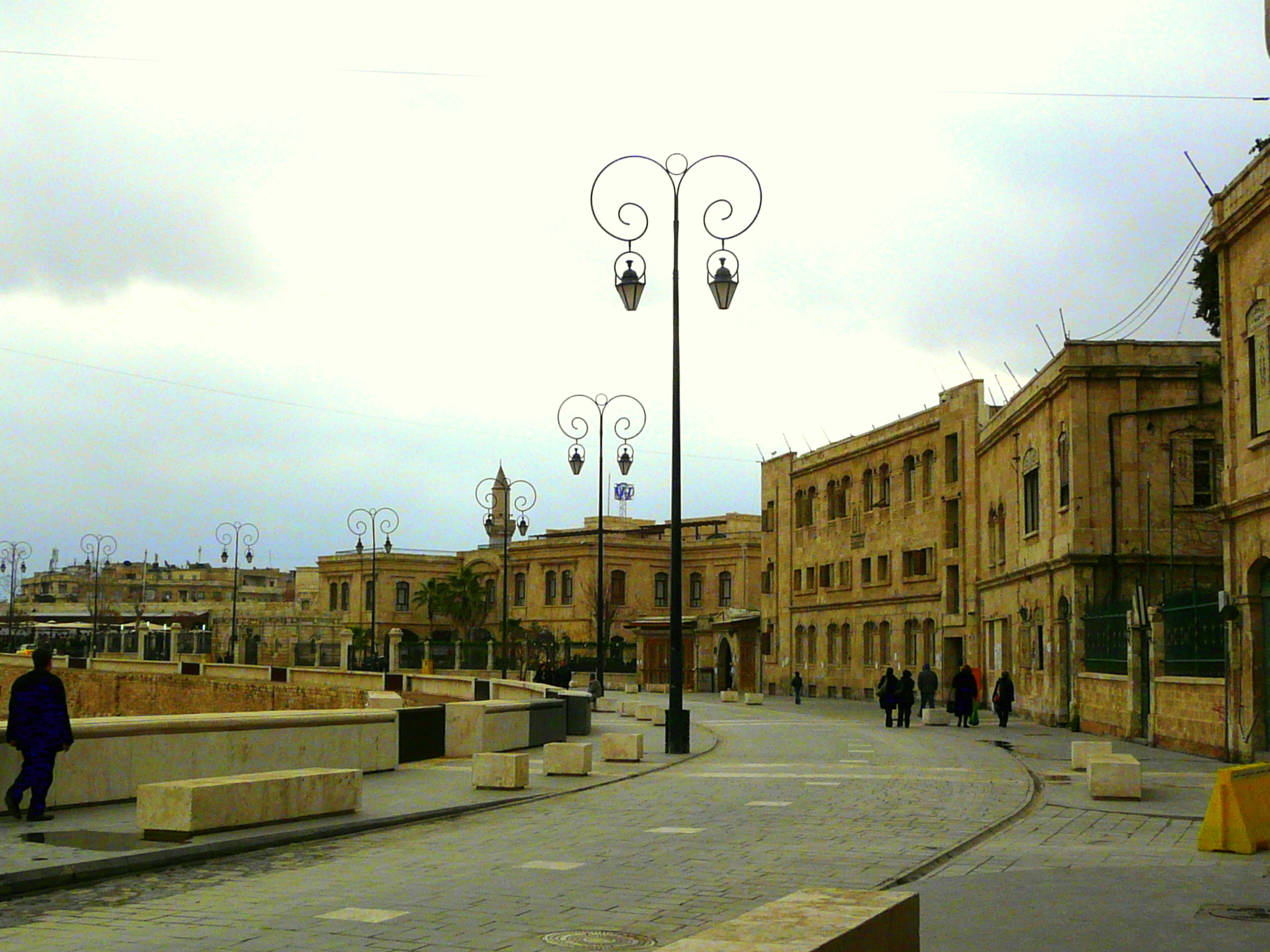
The old street around the citadel at Oghlubek, Altunbogha district

Old quarters around the citadel inside the walls of the ancient city:

- Al-A'jam (الأعجام) district with the neighborhood of ad-Dahdileh (الدحديلة).
- Altunbogha (ألتونبوغا) district with the neighborhoods of Oghlubek (أوغلبك) and Sahet al-Milh (ساحة الملح).
- Aqabeh (العقبة) district with the neighborhoods of Bahsita (بحسيتا), Khan al-Harir (خان الحرير), al-Masaben (المصابن) and Jebb Asad Allah (جب أسد الله).
- Bayadah (البياضة) district with the neighborhoods of Jbeileh الجبيلة, Keltawiyeh (الكلتاوية) and Mustadamiyeh (المستدامية).
- Farafira (الفرافرة) district with the neighborhoods of Bandara (البندرة), Qastal Hajjarin (قسطل الحجارين), ad-Dabbagha al-Atiqa (الدباغة العتيقة), Suweiqat Ali (سويقة علي) and Suweiqat Hatem (سويقة حاتم).
- Jalloum (الجلوم) district with the neighborhoods of Saffahiyeh (السفاحية), Khan al-Wazir (خان الوزير) and Souq al-Madina (سوق المدينة).
- Qal'at al-Sharif (قلعة الشريف) district with the neighborhood of Tallet Alsauda (تلة السودا).
- Al-Qasileh (القصيلة) district with the neighborhood of al-Hawraneh (الحورانة).
- Sahet Bizzeh (ساحة بزة) district with the neighborhood of Maghazleh (المغازلة).

Old quarters outside the walls of the ancient city:

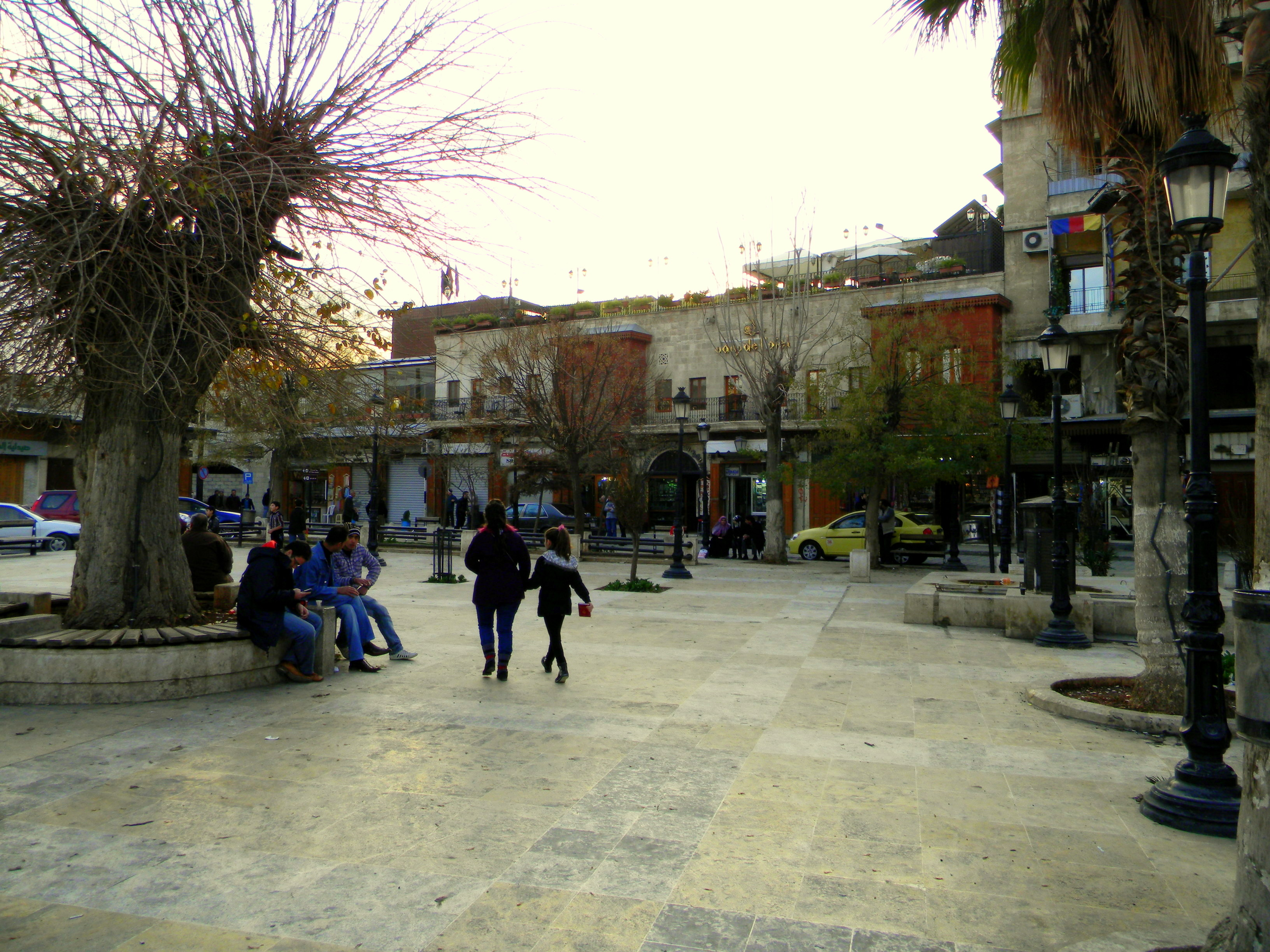
Al-Hatab Square in the Jdeideh quarter

- Abraj (الأبراج) district with the neighborhoods of Haret al-Pasha (حارة الباشا) and Shaker Agha (شاكر آغا).
- Aghyol (أقيول) district with the neighborhood of Shmesatiyeh (الشميصاتية).
- Almaji (ألمه جي) with the neighborhoods of Qastal Harami (قسطل الحرامي), Wakiliyeh (الوكيلية) and Shara'sous (شرعسوس).
- Bab al-Maqam (باب المقام) district with the neighborhoods of al-Maghayer (المغاير) and Maqamat (المقامات).
- Ballat (البلاط) with the neighborhoods of Qattaneh (القطانة) and Sahet Hamad (ساحة حمد).
- Ad-Dallalin (الدلالين) district.
- Ad-Dudu (الضوضو) with the neighborhoods of Safsafeh (الصفصافة), Jubb al-Qubbeh (جب القبة), Jubb Qaraman (جب قرمان) and Barriyet al-Maslakh (برية المسلخ).
- Fardos (الفردوس) district.
- Hazzazeh (الهزازة) with the neighborhoods of at-Tadribeh (التدريبة) and Zuqaq al-Arba'in (زقاق الأربعين).
- Ibn Ya'qoub (ابن يعقوب) district with the neighborhoods of Banqusa (بانقوسا) and Mushatiyeh (المشاطية).
- Beit Meheb district or Al-Jdayde quarter (بيت محب أو الجديدة) with the neighborhoods of Sissi (سيسي), Salibeh (الصليبة), Bawabet al-Qasab (بوابة القصب), Basatneh (البساتنة), al-Muballet (المبلط) and Sahet at-Tananir (ساحة التنانير).
- Kallaseh (الكلاسة) district.
- Muhammad Bek (محمد بك) district (also called Bab al-Nairab) with the neighborhoods of Badenjk (بادنجك), Baggara (البكارة) and Sakhaneh (السخانة).
- Qadi Askar (قاضي عسكر) district with the neighborhood of Hamza Bek (حمزة بك).
- Qarleq (قرلق) district.
- Qastal al-Mosht (قسطل المشط) district with the neighborhoods of al-Aryan (العريان), Trab al-Ghuraba (تراب الغرباء) and Mawardi (الماوردي).
- Sajlikhan (صاجليخان) district with the neighborhood of Aghajek (أغاجك).
- As-Salheen (الصالحين) district.
- Tatarlar (تاتارلار) district.

== Preservation of the ancient city ==
As an ancient trading centre, Aleppo's impressive souqs, khans, hammams, madrasas, mosques and churches are all in need of more care and preservation work. After World War II, the city was significantly redesigned; in 1954 French architect André Gutton had a number of wide new roads cut through the city to allow easier passage for modern traffic. Between 1954–1983 many buildings in the old city were demolished to allow for the construction of modern apartment blocks, particularly in the northwestern areas (Bab al-Faraj and Bab al-Jinan). As awareness for the need to preserve this unique cultural heritage increased, Gutton's master plan was finally abandoned in 1979 to be replaced with a new plan presented by the Swiss expert and urban designer Stefano Bianca, which adopted the idea of "preserving the traditional architectural style of Ancient Aleppo" paving the way for prominent local activists, among them Adli Qudsi, to convince UNESCO to declare the Ancient City of Aleppo as a World Heritage Site in 1986.

The armed conflict in Syria started in March 2011 and has constantly escalated leading to significant violence and degradation of humanitarian conditions. Since the 39th session of the World Heritage Committee (Bonn, 2015), the armed conflict has caused severe damage to the inscribed properties and to the twelve sites inscribed on the Tentative List, by shelling, street fighting, underground explosions, extensive illegal excavations, military use, construction violations, quarrying, in addition to intentional destructions and inappropriate use of archaeological sites by internally displaced populations.

Several international institutions joined efforts with local authorities and the Aleppo Archaeological Society, to rehabilitate the old city by accommodating contemporary life while preserving the old one. The governorate and the municipality were implementing serious programmes directed towards the enhancement of the ancient city and Jdeydeh quarter.

The German Technical Cooperation (GTZ) and Aga Khan Foundation (within the frames of Aga Khan Historic Cities Programme) had a great contribution in the preservation process of the old city. The local representative of the Aga Khan Trust for Culture from 1999 until 2008 was the architect Adli Qudsi, who played a large role in the protection of the Old City from the destructive forces of urban expansion.

The rehabilitation of the Old City of Aleppo has received the Veronica Rudge Green Prize in Urban Design from Harvard University's Graduate School of Design in 2005.

After the Syrian Civil War, Aleppo's ancient buildings, particularly in the Old City, suffered extensive damage. Following the end of the war, efforts were launched to repair them. One example is the restoration of Bayt Wakil, a courtyard mansion from the 17th century.

== See also ==
- Tourism in Syria
- Al-Shibani Church
- Aleppo Codex
- Battle of Aleppo (2012–2016)
- Central Synagogue of Aleppo
- Dead Cities
- Timeline of Aleppo
- List of World Heritage in Danger
