= Adli (name) =

Adli or Adly is both a surname and a given name. Notable people with the name include:

== Surname ==
- Adam Adli (born 1989), Malaysian student activist
- Ahmed Adly (born 1987), Egyptian chess player
- Amine Adli (born 2000), French footballer
- Habib el-Adly (born 1938), Egyptian politician
- Mohamed Adly (born 1987), Egyptian basketball player
- Yacine Adli (born 2000), French footballer

== Given name ==
- Adli El Shafei (1919–?), Egyptian tennis player
- Adli El Shafei II (born 1973), Egyptian tennis player
- Adli Lachheb (born 1987), Tunisian footballer
- Adli Qudsi (1940–2018), Syrian architect
- Adly Yakan Pasha (1864–1933), Egyptian politician
- Adly Kasseb (1918–1978), Egyptian actor
- Adly Mansour (born 1945), Egyptian judge and politician
- Adly Yaish (born 1952), Palestinian mayor
- Adly Zahari (born 1971), Malaysian politician
- Al-Adli, 9th-century Anatolian Shatranj player
- Amirul Adli bin Azmi (born 1996), Singaporean footballer
