= Beit Junblatt =

Coordinates: 36°12′13″N 37°09′31″E

- بيت جنبلاط
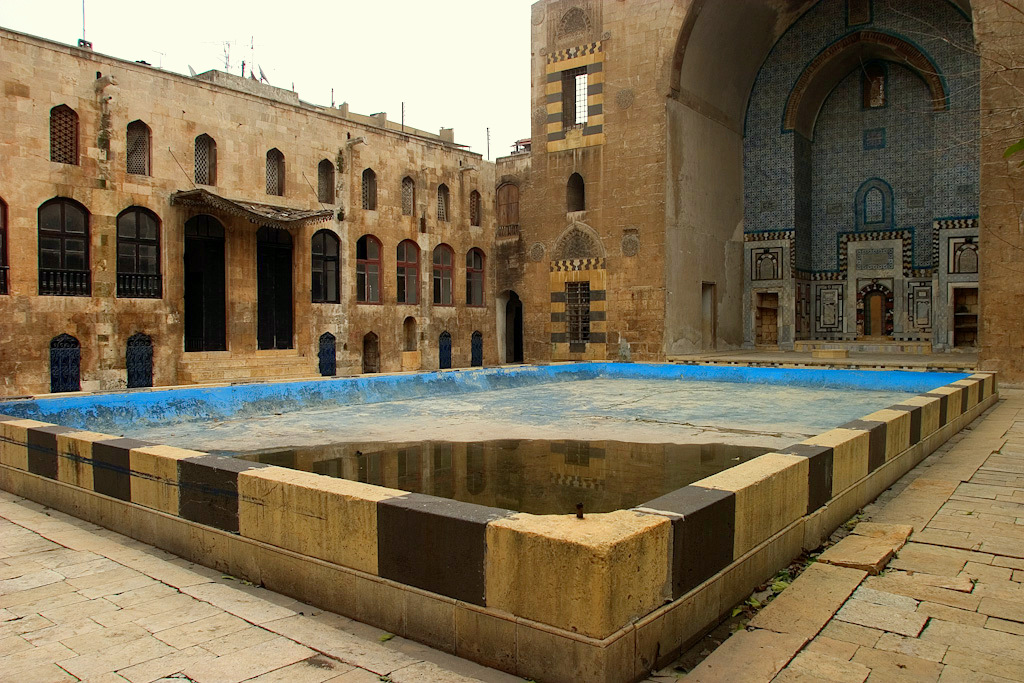
- Beit Junblatt

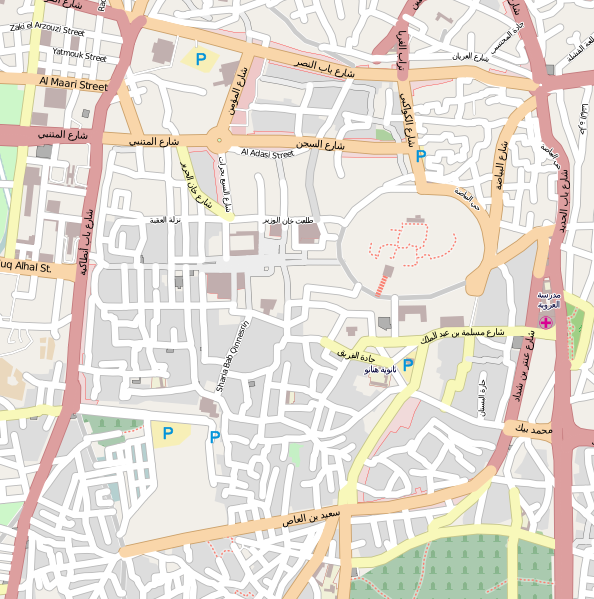
- Location within Ancient City of Aleppo
- Alternative names: Qasr Junblatt

General information
- Type: Palace, Museum
- Location: Aleppo, Syria, Al-Bandarah area, al-Farafira district Ancient Aleppo
- Completed: 16th century
- Cost: One thousand Ottoman gold lira
- Client: Janpolad bek ibn Qasim

Technical details
- Floor count: 2

Beit Junblatt (Arabic: بيت جنبلاط) is a historic mansion that resides in Aleppo, Syria, built in the 16th century by a Kurdish emir of the Janbulad family.

== Background ==
Beit Junblatt (Arabic: بيت جنبلاط); originally Janpolad Palace (Arabic: قصر جان بولاد), is a historic mansion in Aleppo, Syria, built during the 2nd half of the 16th century by a Kurdish emir of the Janbulad family, Janbulad ibn Qasim. In 1604–1605, it briefly served as a residence for the Ottoman wāli of Aleppo Hussein Pasha Janpolad.

The mansion is located at al-Bandarah area of al-Farafira district, within the walls of the Ancient City of Aleppo. According to the Aleppine historian sheikh Kamel al-Ghazzi, emir Janpolad spent 1,000 Ottoman gold lira to build the palace. Since 1766, the palace became the property of al-Kawakibi family. In 1814, it then served as the residence of the mufti of Aleppo sheikh Hasan Afandi al-Kawakibi.

Beit Junblatt is believed to have the largest iwan in Aleppo, decorated with fine qashani ceramic-tiled mosaic wall, depicting several Persian-type inscriptions. Like the vast majority of Arabic traditional houses, the square-shaped courtyard of the palace has a large water fountain in the centre mainly used for wudu. It has been described as one of the most beautiful palaces built in the city.

However, many associated external buildings around the palace—including a military barrack and stables—were said to have been ruined during the 1960s. It was subsequently restored by the Kuwait-Syria-Arab Fund to serve as a cultural center and library.

== War damage ==
Beit Junblatt (Dar Janpolad) suffered material damage from fighting and looting during the Battle of Aleppo (2012–2016). Numerous tiles were removed from the building's iwan allegedly to be shown as samples to international antiquities dealers. Similar tiles were sold at a Western auction house in 2015.

== Gallery ==
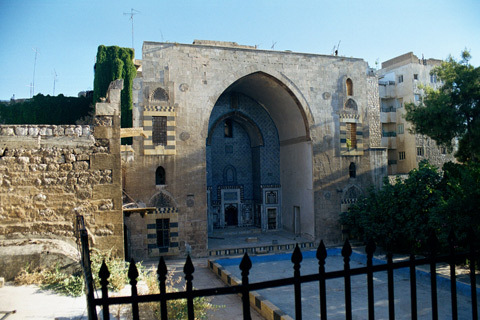
Beit Junblatt Iwan (2001)

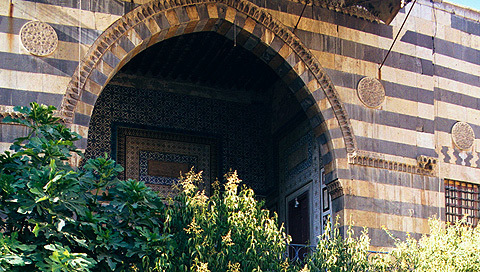
Beit Junblatt (2001)

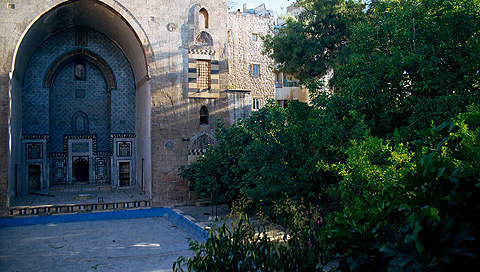
Beit Junblatt (2001)

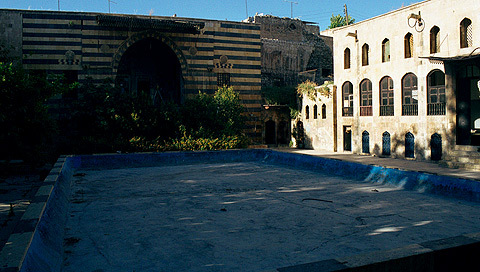
Beit Junblatt (2001)

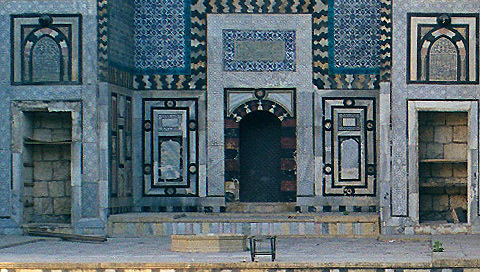
Beit Junblatt (2001)

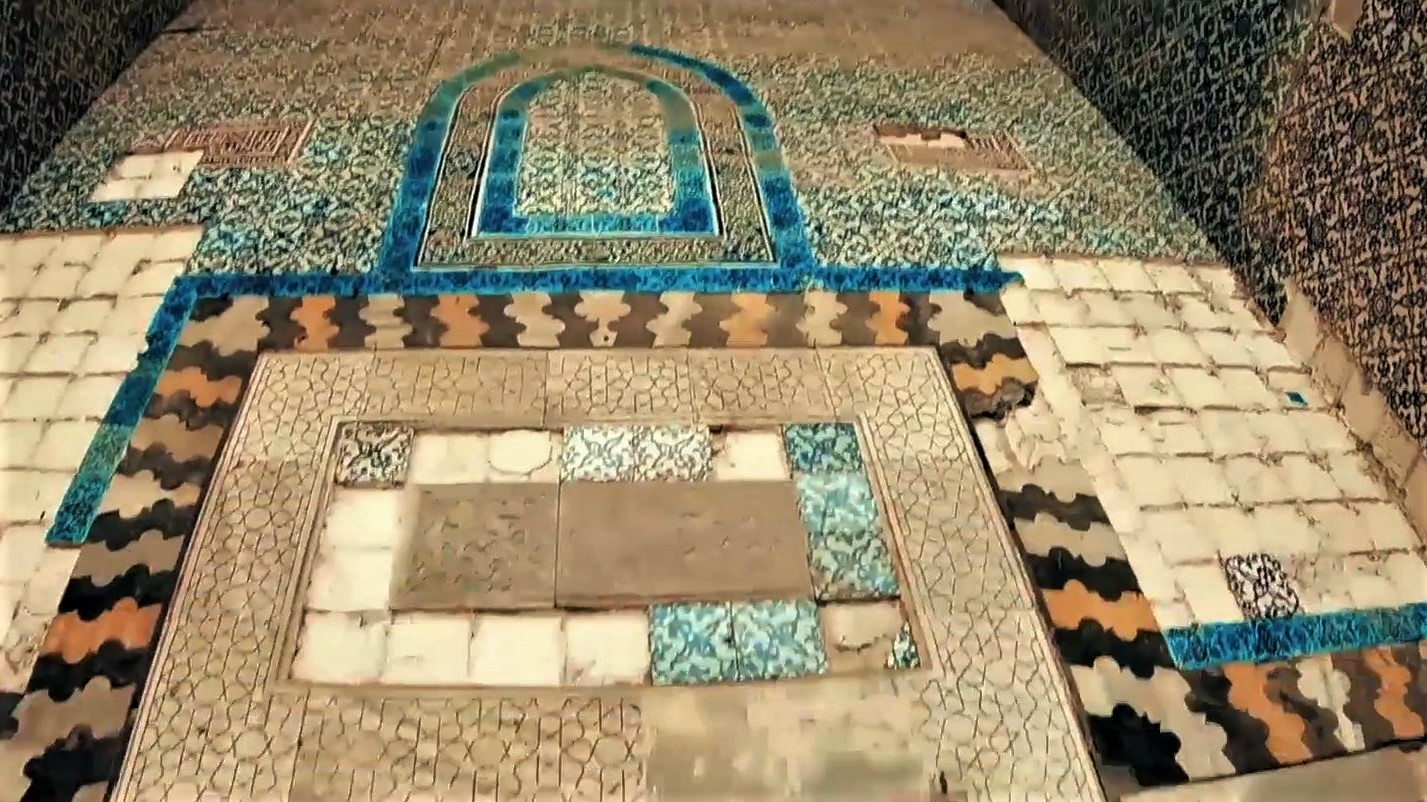
Beit Junblatt (2018) missing decorative elements

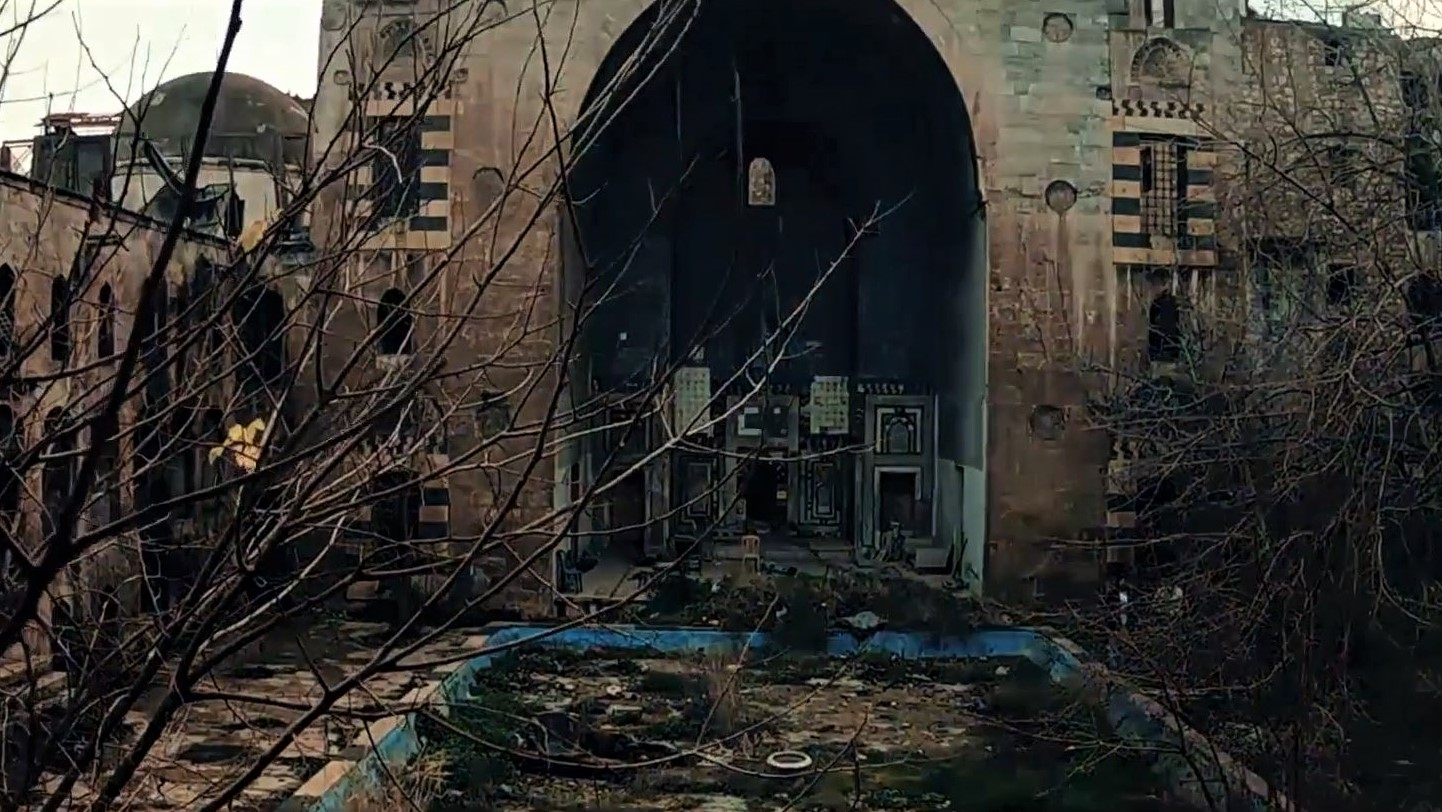
Beit Junblatt Iwan (2018) Aleppo
