= André Gutton =

French architect

André Gutton (8 January 1904 – 10 November 2002) was a French architect.

Gutton became employed by the French government in 1927 as a town planner, and was successively chief architect of civil buildings and palaces in 1936. He served as chief architect of the Institute of France during 1943–1969, and after World War II he was employed in Aleppo, Syria, in which he redesigned part of the city and in 1952 had a number of roads widened to allow easier passage for modern traffic. He was chief architect of the Paris Opera (1950–1954), and a professor at the École nationale supérieure des Beaux-Arts (1949–1958) and at the Institute of Urban Planning at the University of Paris (1944–1952).
