= Adli Qudsi =

Syrian architect (1940–2018)

- Born: July 11, 1940; Aleppo, Syria
- Died: January 21, 2018 (aged 77); Mersin, Turkey
- Occupation: Architect

Adli Qudsi (July 11, 1940 – January 21, 2018) was a Syrian architect known for his efforts in the reconstruction and preservation of the ancient city of Aleppo, Syria. In the 1970s, he successfully halted an urban expansion project that would have widened the streets of the Old City. In the 1980s, his lobbying efforts succeeded in placing Old Aleppo on the UNESCO World Heritage Site list. By 2008, Qudsi had dedicated decades of his life to the rehabilitation of the historic neighborhood and hoped it would be a "fruitful example" to other cities whose ancient quarters were at risk of decay.

== Biography ==
=== Early life and education ===
Qudsi was born in Aleppo, on July 11, 1940, and spent the first 13 years of his life in a courtyard house in the Old City. Qudsi received his degree in Architecture from Washington State University in 1964 and lived in Seattle for 16 years.

=== Return to Aleppo and Early Activism ===
In 1975, Qudsi returned to his hometown, where he found the municipal authorities had adopted a European-inspired Master Plan aiming to widen the roads in the Old City and cut through its fabric. Qudsi was determined to stop the bulldozers and, in 1978, after meeting with local officials and with the support of a group of concerned residents, he convinced the Cultural Minister to register Aleppo as a historic site, temporarily halting all renovations and demolitions. In 1978, officials from UNESCO visited Aleppo, and declared the city as a World Heritage Site in 1986. By 1990, all work demolishing the city came to a halt. In 1994, an emergency fund was created to fund his idea of interest-free loans for Aleppo's residents to restore their homes.

=== Old City Conservation Efforts ===
After successfully halting the Master Plan, Qudsi dedicated the following decades of his life to the rehabilitation and preservation of the Old City of Aleppo. He founded Conception and Construction Consultants, a private architecture office which executed projects across the Old City, and was appointed the Aga Khan Trust for Culture representative in Syria in 1999. In 1990, he launched the "Project for the Rehabilitation of the Old City of Aleppo" with the support of the German government (GiZ) and the Arab Fund for Economic and Social Development in Kuwait. In 2007, he created the "Friends of the Citadel of Aleppo" foundation with the aim of supporting the administration, rehabilitation and maintenance of the Aleppo Citadel and its surroundings.

== Recognition ==
Qudsi was selected as an Associate Laureate for the Rolex Awards in 1998 in "Recognition of his struggle to preserve and rehabilitate the Old City of Aleppo".

== Published works ==
In 1995, he prepared a project paper entitled "Modernization of City Administration: Management, Urban and Environmental Planning" which became the basis of an active EU project to upgrade six major municipalities in Syria.

== Personal life and death ==
Qudsi was married to Arij Shalab Al Sham and is survived by two daughters, Jwanah Qudsi and Laila Qudsi. Qudsi died in a traffic accident in Mersin, Turkey, on January 21, 2018, 77.
