= Uthmaniyya Madrasa (Aleppo) =

Madrasa in Aleppo, Syria

Coordinates: 36°12′12″N 37°9′24″E

- الْمَدْرَسَة الْعُثْمَانِيَّة

Location
- al-Farafira district Aleppo; Syria

Information
- Type: madrasa
- Established: 1730
- Campus: Urban
- Affiliation: Islamic

The Uthmaniyya Madrasa (Arabic: الْمَدْرَسَة الْعُثْمَانِيَّة, romanized: al-Madrasa l-ʿUṯmāniyya) is a madrasa complex in Aleppo, Syria.

== See also ==
- Al-Firdaws Madrasa
- Sultaniyya Madrasa
- Zahiriyya Madrasa
- Ancient City of Aleppo
- Khusruwiyah Mosque

== Sources ==
- Nsiri, Imed (2019). Arabic Heritage in the Post-Abbasid Period.
