= List of Islamic seminaries =

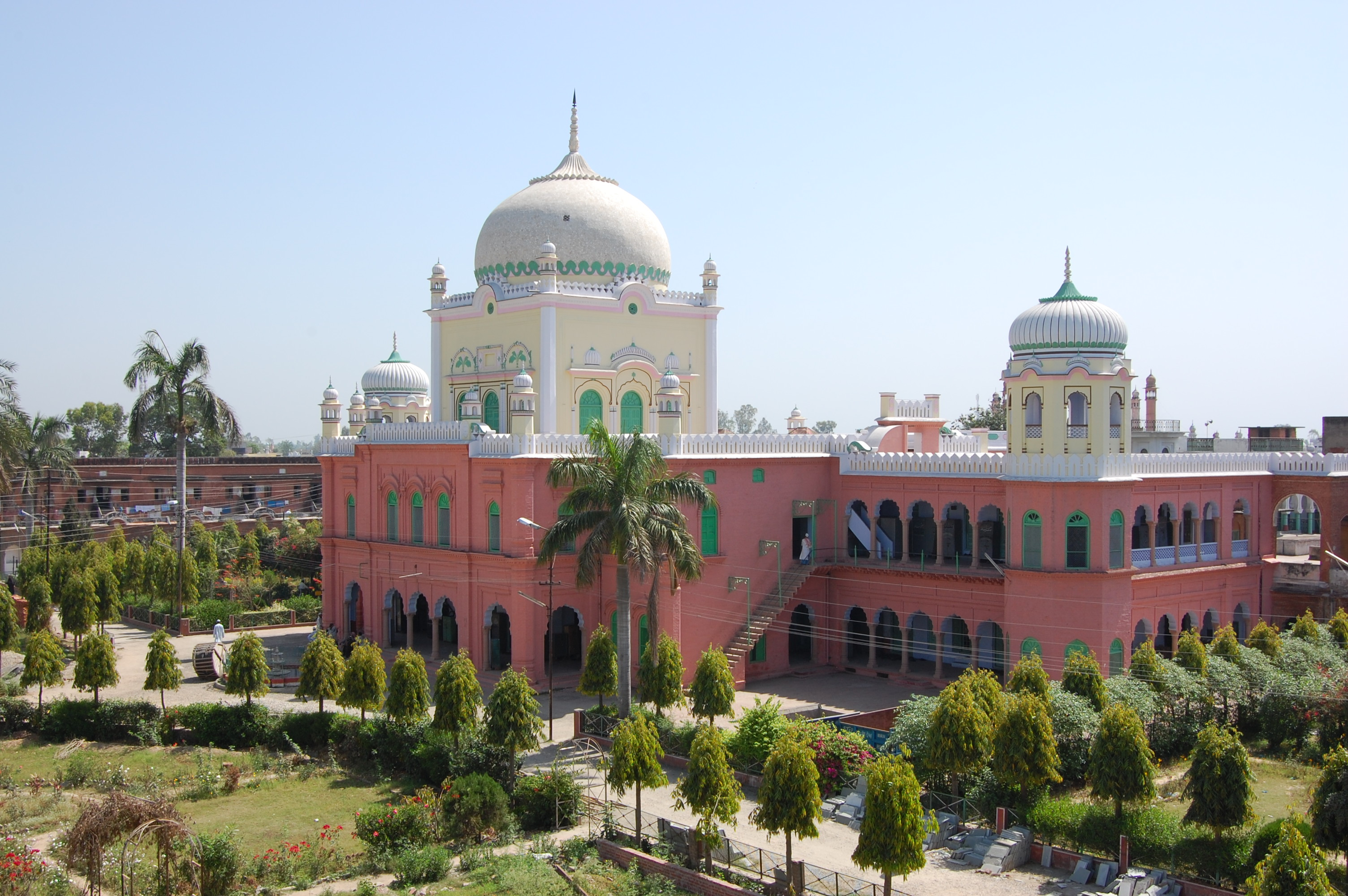
Darul Uloom Deoband, India

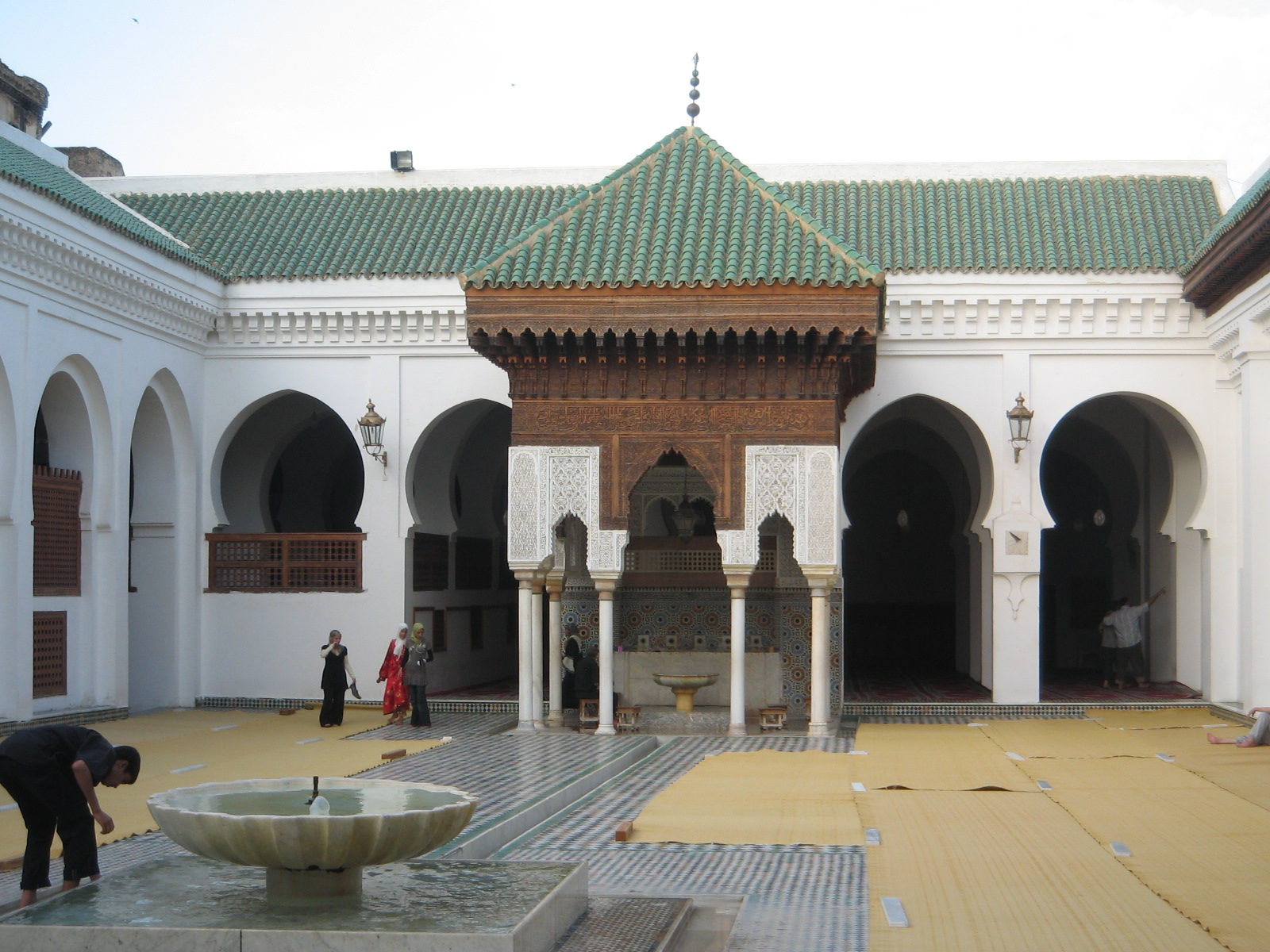
University of Al Quaraouiyine in Fes, the oldest existing, continually operating and the first degree awarding educational institution in the world, according to UNESCO and Guinness World Records

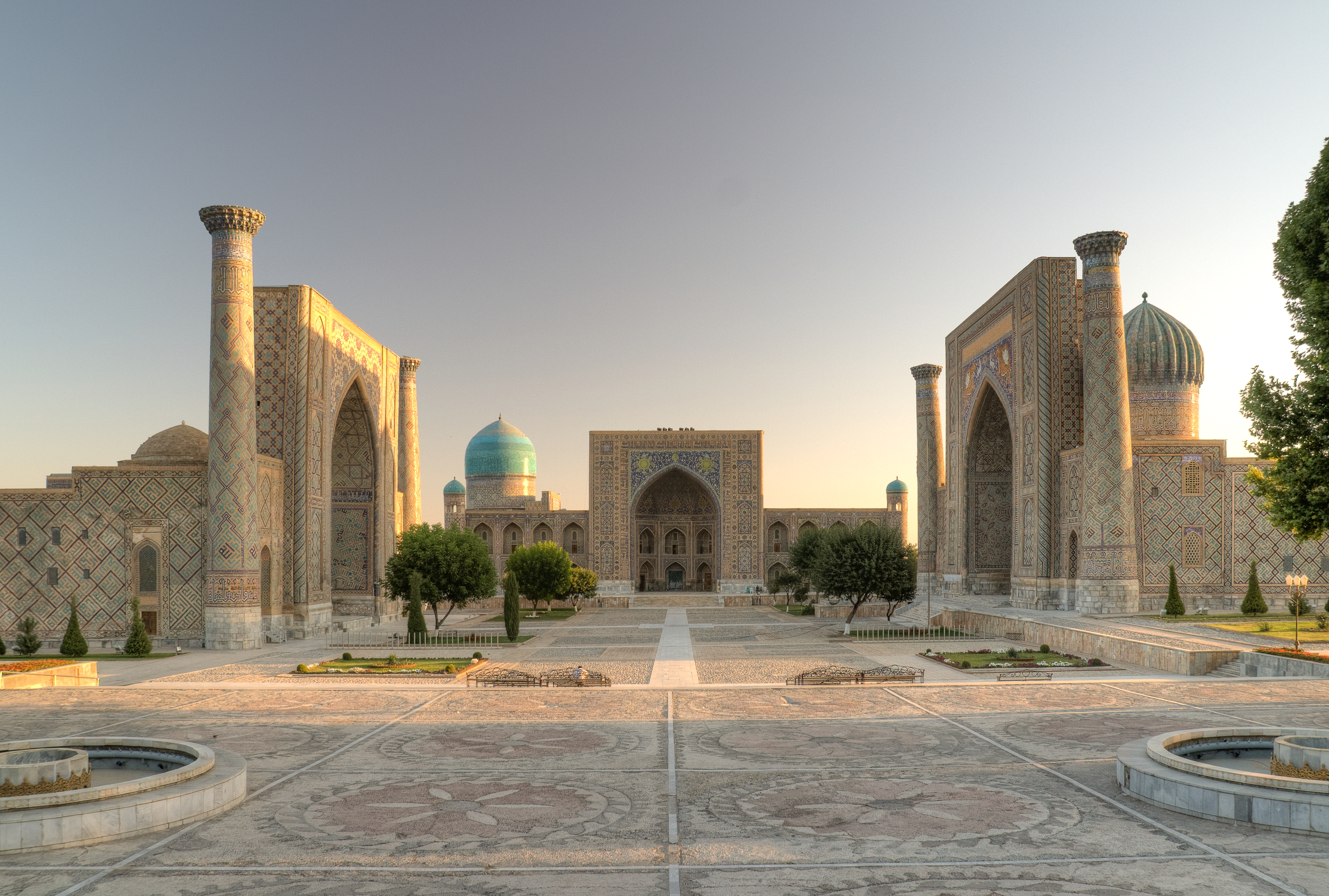
The Registan and its three madrasas (from left to right): the Ulugh Beg Madrasa, the Tilakari Madrasa and the Sherdar Madrasa.

This is a list of Islamic seminaries throughout history, including the operational, historical, defunct or converted ones. This list includes mainly madrasas in the Western context, which refers to a specific type of religious school or college for the study of the Islamic religion and Islamic educations, though this may not be the only subject studied. It also includes sectarian or regional variants which have distinct characteristics and traditions, though they serves identical purposes as seminary, namely Hawza of Shi'a Islam, Nizamiyya in the medieval Persia, Darul Uloom which has roots in South Asia, Qawmi in Bangladesh, pesantren in Indonesia, and pondok in Malaysia and Southern Thailand. This list does not include institutions which are not religious seminaries, but have an Islamic identity or charter, or devoted to sciences and arts usually associated with Islamic culture and history, namely Islamic University.

== List of Islamic seminaries ==
The listings are in alphabetical order by country.

=== Bangladesh ===
- Tamirul Millat Kamil Madrasah , Dhaka
- Al-Jamiah Al-Islamiah Obaidia Nanupur, Chittagong
- Al-Jamiah Al-Islamiah Patiya, Chittagong
- Al-Jamiatul Ahlia Darul Ulum Moinul Islam, Chittagong
- Al-Jamiatul Islamiah Azizul Uloom Babunagar, Chittagong
- Al-Markazul Islami As-Salafi, Nawdapara
- Islamic Research Center Bangladesh, Bashundhara
- Jamia Darul Ma'arif Al-Islamia, Chittagong
- Jamia Qurania Arabia Lalbagh, Dhaka
- Jamia Shari'ah Malibag, Dhaka, Dhaka
- Jamia Tawakkulia Renga Madrasah, Sylhet
- Jamiah Islamiah Yunusia Brahmanbaria, Brahmanbaria
- Jamiatul Uloom Al-Islamia Lalkhan Bazar, Chittagong
- Satpur Kamil Madrasah, Bishwanath, Sylhet.

=== Bosnia and Herzegovina ===
- Gazi Husrev Bey's Madrasa, Sarajevo
- Behram-Begova Medresa Tuzla, Tuzla
- Faculty of Islamic Studies of the University of Sarajevo

=== Cyprus ===
- Great Madrasah, Nicosia

=== Egypt ===
- Al-Azhar Madrasa, Cairo
- Emir Qurqumas Complex, Cairo
- Madrasa of Jamal al-Din, Cairo
- Madrassa of Al-Nasir Muhammad, Cairo
- Qalawun complex, Cairo
- Salihiyya Madrasa, Cairo
- Madrasa of Sarghatmish, Cairo
- Mosque and Khanqah of Shaykhu, Cairo
- Sultan Al-Ghuri Complex, Cairo
- Mosque-Madrassa of Sultan Hassan, Cairo

=== India ===
- Jamia Salafia, Varanasi
- Darul Uloom Deoband, Deoband
- Darul Uloom Waqf, Deoband
- Darul Uloom Nadwatul Ulama, Lucknow
- Al Jamiatul Ashrafia, Uttar Pradesh, India
- Aljamea-tus-Saifiyah, Surat
- Al-Jame-atul-Islamia, Raunahi
- Arusiyyah Madrasah, Tamil Nadu
- Baqiyat Salihat Arabic College, Tamil Nadu
- Coordination of Islamic Colleges
- Darul Uloom Banskandi, Cachar district, Assam
- Jamia Al Barkaat Aligarh, Aligarh
- Darul Uloom Mau, Mau
- Jamia Miftahul Uloom, Mau
- Jamia Amjadia Rizvia, Ghosi
- Jamiatur Raza, Bareilly
- Jamia Islamia Talimuddin
- Jamia Darussalam, Tamil Nadu
- Jamia Nizamia, Hyderabad
- Markazu Saqafathi Sunniyya, Kerala
- Manzar-e-Islam, Bareilly
- Mazahir Uloom, Saharanpur
- Jamea Tul Hidaya, Jaipur

=== Indonesia ===
- Pondok Pesantren Gading Mangu Perak Jombang, Jombang
- Pondok Pesantren Al Manshurin Metro Lampung, Metro
- Pondok Pesantren Millenium Alfina, Nganjuk
- Pondok Pesantren Minhaajurrosyidiin Jakarta, Jakarta
- Pondok Pesantren Walibarokah Burengan Banjaran Kediri, Kediri
- Pondok Pesantren Waria Al-Fatah, Yogyakarta
- Pondok Modern Darussalam Gontor, Ponorogo
- Pondok Ngruki, Sukoharjo
- Ma'had Al-Zaytun, Indramayu

=== Iran ===
- Qom Seminary, Qom
- Isfahan Seminary, Isfahan
- Sadr Madrasa, Isfahan
- Nimavar school, Isfahan
- Chaharbagh School, Isfahan
- Shahid Motahari University, Tehran
- Jamiah Darul Uloom Zahedan, Zahedan

=== Iraq ===
- Mustansiriya Madrasa, Baghdad
- Nizamiyya of Baghdad, Baghdad
- Hawza of Najaf, Najaf

=== Ireland ===
- Al-Mustafa Islamic Cultural Centre Ireland

=== Mali ===
- Djinguereber Madrasa, Timbuktu
- Sidi Yahya Madrasa, Timbuktu
- Sankore Madrasah, Timbuktu

=== Morocco ===
- Al-Attarine Madrasa, Fes
- Ben Youssef Madrasa, Marrakesh
- Bou Inania Madrasa, Fes
- Bou Inania Madrasa, Meknes
- Al Quaraouiyine Madrasa, Fes

=== Pakistan ===
- Aleemiyah Institute of Islamic Studies
- Dar Uloom Amjadia Karachi
- Jamia Naeemia Lahore
- Jamia Nizamia Ghousia Wazirabad
- Jamia-tul-Madina
- Ashraf ul Madaris, Okara
- Darul Uloom Haqqania, Akora Khattak
- Darul 'Uloom Karachi, Karachi
- Jamia Binoria, Karachi
- Jamia Faridia, Islamabad
- Jamia Hafsa, Islamabad
- Jamia Uloom-ul-Islamia, Karachi

=== Palestine ===
- Mahkamah Madrasa, Gaza City

=== Saudi Arabia ===
- Ghiyasia Madrasa, Mecca
- Ghiyasia Madrasa, Medina

=== Singapore ===
- Madrasah Al-Irsyad Al-Islamiah
- Madrasah Aljunied Al-Islamiah
- Madrasah Al-Maarif Al-Islamiah
- Madrasah Alsagoff Al-Arabiah
- Madrasah Al-Arabiah Al-Islamiah

=== Spain ===
- Madrasah of Granada, Granada

=== Syria ===
- Al-Adiliyah Madrasa, Damascus
- Al-Ahmadiyah Madrasa, Aleppo
- Al-Fathiyah Madrasa, Damascus
- Al-Firdaws Madrasa, Aleppo
- Al-Halawiyah Madrasa, Aleppo
- Al-Kameliyah Madrasa, Aleppo
- Al-Mujahidiyah Madrasa, Damascus
- Al-Muqaddamiyah Madrasa, Aleppo
- Nur al-Din Madrasa, Damascus
- Al-Qilijiyah Madrasa, Damascus
- Al-Rukniyah Madrasa, Damascus
- Al-Sahiba Madrasa, Damascus
- Al-Salimiyah Madrasa, Damascus
- Al-Shadbakhtiyah Madrasa, Aleppo
- Al-Shamiyah al-Kubra Madrasa, Damascus
- Al-Sharafiyah Madrasa, Aleppo
- Al-Sibaiyah Madrasa, Damascus
- Al-Sultaniyah Madrasa, Aleppo
- Al-Turantaiyah Madrasa, Aleppo
- Al-Uthmaniyah Madrasa, Aleppo
- Al-Zahiriyah Library, Damascus
- Al-Zahiriyah Madrasa, Aleppo

=== Sudan ===
- Khalawi al-Ghubish, Berber
- Khalawi Hamishkoreib, Hamishkoreib

=== Tunisia ===
- Madrasa Al Habibia Al Kubra, Tunis
- Madrasa Al Habibia Al Sughra, Tunis
- Madrasa Al Husseiniya Al Kubra, Tunis
- Madrasa Al Husseiniya Al Sughra, Tunis
- Madrasa Al Jassoussia, Tunis
- Madrasa Khaldounia, Tunis
- Madrasa Asfouria, Tunis
- Madrasa Andaloussiya, Tunis
- Madrasa Caid Mourad, Tunis
- Madrasa Ibn Tafargine, Tunis
- Madrasa Bir Lahjar, Tunis
- Madrasa El Jedid, Tunis
- Madrasa Ech Chamaiya, Tunis
- Madrasa El Achouria, Tunis
- Madrasa El Bachia, Tunis
- Madrasa El Bechiria, Tunis
- Madrasa El Kacemia, Tunis
- Madrasa El Maghribia, Tunis
- Madrasa El Mountaciriya, Tunis
- Madrasa El Mettichia, Tunis
- Madrasa El Tawfikia, Tunis
- Madrasa El Unqiya, Tunis
- Madrasa El Yusefiya, Tunis
- Madrasa Ennakhla, Tunis
- Madrasa Ez-Zitouna, Tunis
- Madrasa Hamzia, Tunis
- Madrasa Hamzia, Tunis
- Madrasa Mouradiyya, Tunis
- Madrasa Salhia, Tunis
- Madrasa Slimania, Tunis
- Madrasa Saheb Ettabaâ, Tunis
- Madrasa of Zawiya El Bokria, Tunis

=== Turkey ===
- Büyük Aga Medrese, Amasya
- Caferağa Medresseh, Istanbul
- Gök Medrese, Tokat
- Gök Medrese, Sivas
- Hatuniye Külliyesi, Tokat
- Hatuniye Medresesi, Karaman
- Ince Minaret Medrese, Konya
- Karatay Madrasa, Konya
- Kasımiye Medrese, Mardin
- Kubat Pasha Madrasa, Tarsus
- Medrese of Mehmet Şakir Paşa, Mustafapaşa
- Pervane Medrese, Sinop
- Sahn-ı Seman Medrese, Istanbul
- Seyyid Battal Gazi Complex, Seyitgazi
- Şifaiye Medrese, Sivas
- Sırçalı Medrese, Konya
- Yakutiye Medrese, Erzurum
- Vacidiye Medrese, Kütahya

=== United Kingdom ===
- Jamia Al-Karam
- Darul Uloom, Birmingham
- Darul Uloom, Bolton
- Darul Uloom, London
- Jamiatul Ilm Wal Huda, Blackburn
- Darul Uloom, Bury
- Jamea Al Kauthar, Lancaster

=== United States ===
- Darul Uloom Al-Madania, Buffalo
- Zaytuna College, California

=== Ukraine ===
- Zıncırlı medrese, Crimea

=== Uzbekistan ===
- Abulkasym Madrassah, Tashkent
- Dorut Tilavat, Bukhara
- Mir-i Arab Madrassah, Bukhara
- Sherdar Madrasa, Samarkand
- Tilakari Madrasa, Samarkand
- Said Otaliq Madrasa, Denov
- Ulugh Beg Madrasa, Samarkand

=== Yemen ===
- Amiriya Madrasa, Rada
- Dar al-Mustafa, Tarim

== List of oldest Islamic seminaries ==
Year	Current Location	Name	Other notes
737	Tunis, Tunisia	University of Ez-Zitouna	For centuries, Kairouan was the early centre of learning and intellectual pursuits in Tunisia and North Africa in general. Starting from the 13th century, Tunis became the capital of Ifriqiya under Almohad and Hafsid rule. This shift in power helped Ez-Zitouna to flourish and become one of the major centres of Islamic learning, and Ibn Khaldun, the first social historian in history was one of its products. The flourishing university attracted students and men of learning from all parts of the known world at the time. Along with theology (mainly the Qur'an), the university taught jurisprudence, history, grammar, science and medicine. When it comes to books and libraries, Ez-Zituna libraries were the richest among North African counterparts. It had several collections totaling tens of thousands of books. One of its libraries, el-Abdaliyah, included a large collection of rare and unique manuscripts. The manuscripts covered almost all subjects and sciences, including grammar, logic, documentations, etiquette of research, cosmology, arithmetic, geometry, minerals, vocational training, etc.
859	Fes, Morocco	University of Al Quaraouiyine	Founded by Fatima al-Fihri, originally as a mosque. In addition to being a place for worship, the mosque soon developed into a place for religious instruction and political discussion, gradually extending its education to a broad range of subjects, particularly the natural sciences. Al-Karaouine played, in medieval times, a leading role in the cultural exchange and transfer of knowledge between Muslims and Europeans. Pioneer scholars such as Ibn Maimun (Maimonides) (1135–1204), Al-Idrissi (d.1166 AD), Ibn al-Arabi (1165–1240 AD), Ibn Khaldun (1332–1395 AD), Ibn al-Khatib, Al-Bitruji (Alpetragius), Ibn Hirzihim, and Al-Wazzan were all connected with the university either as students or lecturers. Among Christian scholars visiting Al-Karaouine were the Belgian Nicolas Cleynaerts and the Dutchman Golius. Among the subjects taught, alongside the Qur'an and Fiqh (Islamic jurisprudence), are grammar, rhetoric, logic, medicine, mathematics, astronomy, chemistry, history, geography and music. It is considered the oldest university in the world by some scholars, and the oldest continuously operating degree-granting institution in the world by the Guinness Book of Records, although some dispute this claim.
970-972	Cairo, Egypt	Al-Azhar University	Founded by Jawhar al-Siqilli of the Fatimid Caliphate, this university served as a center for Arabic literature and Sunni Islamic learning. The college (Jami'ah) had faculties in Islamic law and jurisprudence, Arabic grammar, astronomy, Islamic philosophy, and logic. Al-Azhar is considered by some as the world's second oldest surviving degree-granting institute. According to the Encyclopedia of Islam, Al-Azhar was a religious university, a madrasa and center of higher learning. In the 1950s, Al-Azhar underwent significant change, with new regulations and reform resulting in an expanded role. In 1961 it became a modern university when many modern secular faculties were added, such as medicine, engineering and agriculture.
1065	Isfahan, Iran	Nizamiyya	Nizamiyya: This series of universities was established by Khwaja Nizam al-Mulk in the eleventh century in what is now present-day Iran. The most celebrated of all the Nizamiyya schools is the Nizamiyya of Baghdad, established in 1065 in Dhu'l Qa'da and that remains operational in Isfahan. But this was just one of many Nizamiyya schools—others were located in Nishapur, Amul, Mosul, Herat, Damascus, and Basra. The Nizamiyya schools served as a model for future universities in the region, and al-Mulk often is seen as responsible for a new era of brilliance which caused his schools to eclipse all other contemporary learning institutions.
1227	Baghdad, Iraq	Mustansiriya Madrasah	Mustansiriya Madrasah was a medieval-era scholarly complex that provided a universal system of higher education. It was established in 1227 CE and was named after and built by the Abbasid Caliph al-Mustansir in Baghdad, Iraq. The Madrasa taught many different subjects, including medicine, math, literature, grammar, philosophy, and Islamic religious studies. However, the major focus of education was Islamic law. It became the most prominent and high-ranking center for Islamic studies in all of Baghdad. Madrasas during the Abbasid period were used as the predominant instrument to foster the spread of Sunni thought as well as a way to extend the founder's pious ideals. The architecture of the Madrasa was also an important example of Islamic architectural development in Baghdad. The Madrasa has experienced several periods of decline and reemergence throughout its history. The most significant degradation to the Madrasa's architecture and position within Baghdad was the Mongol Siege of Baghdad (1258). Today, the Madrasa is in a state of restoration as is it being overseen by the Directorate of Antiquities in Iraq. It is currently a part of the Al-Mustansiriya University, and is located on the left bank of the Tigris River. Adjacent landmarks include the Saray souq, the Baghdadi Museum, Mutanabbi Street, the Abbasid Palace, and Caliph's Street.

== See also ==
- List of Islamic educational institutions
- List of Deobandi madrasas
