= Al-Qilijiyah Madrasa =

Madrasa in Damascus, Syria

- الْمَدْرَسَة الْقِلِيجِيَّة

Location
- Al-Buzuriyah Souq; Damascus; Syria

Information
- Type: madrasa
- Established: 1254
- Founder: Sayf al-Din Ali bin Qilij al-Nuri
- Campus: Urban
- Affiliation: Islamic

Al-Qilijiyah Madrasa (Arabic: الْمَدْرَسَة الْقِلِيجِيَّة, romanized: al-Madrasah al-Qilījīyah) is a madrasa complex located between Al-Buzuriyah Souq and the Azm Palace inside the walled old city of Damascus, Syria.

== See also ==
- Al-Firdaws Madrasa
- Al-Sultaniyah Madrasa
- Al-Zahiriyah Madrasa
- Khusruwiyah Mosque
