= Al-Turantaiyah Madrasa =

Madrasa in Aleppo, Syria

Coordinates: 36°11′16″N 37°9′38″E

al-Turantaiyah Madrasa
- الْمَدْرَسَة الطُّرَنْطَائِيَّة
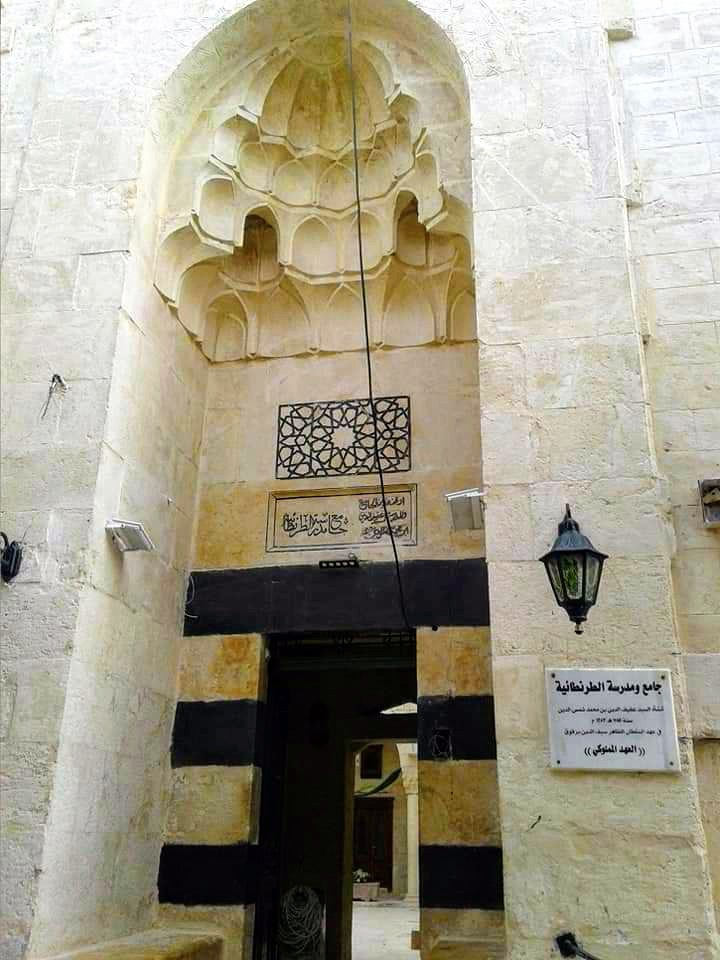
- al-Turantaiyah Madrasa in 2020
- Bab al-Nairab, Aleppo; Syria

Information
- Type: madrasa
- Established: 1251
- Campus: Urban
- Affiliation: Islamic

Al-Turantaiyah Mosque and Madrasa (Arabic: جَامِع ومَدْرَسَة الطُّرَنْطَائِيَّة, romanized: Jāmiʿ wa Madrasa al-Ṭuranṭāʾīyah) is a madrasa and a mosque complex in Aleppo, Syria. It was built between 1241 and 1251 by the Aleppine historian Ibn al-Udaym.

Located outside the city walls to the east of Bab al-Nairab gate, the madrasah was first known as al-Kamaliyah al-Udaymiyah (Arabic: الْكَمَالِيَّة الْعُدَيْمِيَّة, romanized: al-Kamālīyah al-ʿUdaymīyah). Later on, during the 14th century it was renamed after Afif ad-Din al-Turantay al-Mansuri the ruler of Damascus and the representative of the Mamluk sultan Al Mansur Qalawun.

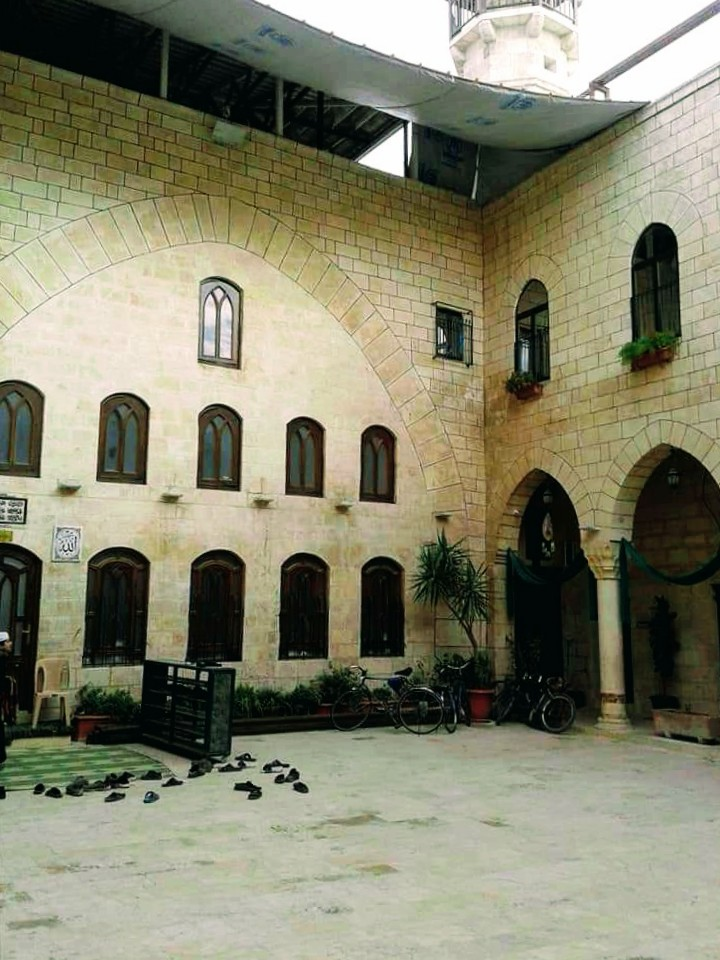
Al-Turantayiah Madrasa in 2020, courtyard

== See also ==
- Al-Firdaws Madrasa
- Al-Sultaniyah Madrasa
- Al-Uthmaniyah Madrasa
- Al-Zahiriyah Madrasa
- Ancient City of Aleppo
- Khusruwiyah Mosque
- List of mosques in Aleppo
