= Pondok Pesantren Al Manshurin Metro Lampung =

Madrasa in Metro, Lampung, Indonesia

Pondok Pesantren Al Manshurin

Location
- Jl. Merica I No. 17 Iringmulyo, East Metro; Sumatra; Metro, Lampung; Indonesia
- Coordinates: 5.122495°S 105.317272°E

Information
- Type: Pondok Pesantren
- Motto: "Pillars, Compact, Keja Just Good, Honest, Amanah, Efficient and hard work"
- Religious affiliation: Islam
- Established: 1950
- Superintendent: H. Hadi Sukasman
- Principal: Nurjaya Abdullah
- Grades: -
- Enrollment: -
- Colors: White and green
- Newspaper: Nuansa Persada

Pondok Pesantren Al Manshurin is an Islamic school in Metro, Lampung.

== See also ==
- Indonesia Institute of Islamic Dawah
