= Al-Halawiyah Madrasa =

Madrasa in Aleppo, Syria

Coordinates: 36°11′58.25″N 37°9′21.25″E

al-Halawiyah Madrasa
- الْمَدْرَسَة الْحَلَاوِيَّة
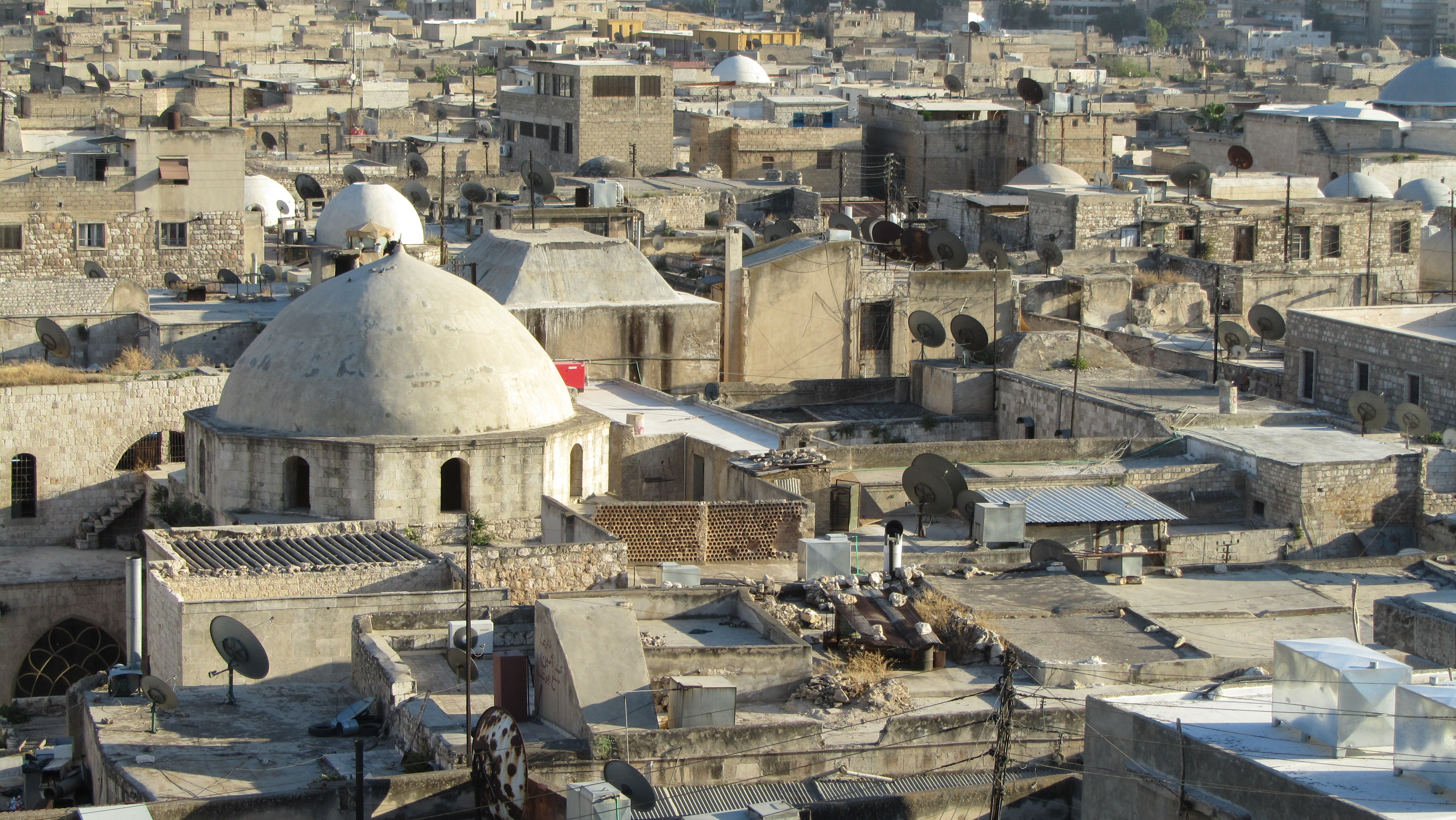
- Al-Halawiyah Madrassa, 2012
- Aleppo; Syria

Information
- Type: Madrasa
- Established: 1149
- Campus: Urban
- Affiliation: Islamic

Al-Halawiyah Madrasa (Arabic: الْمَدْرَسَة الْحَلَاوِيَّة, romanized: al-Madrasa al-Ḥalāwīyah) is a madrasa complex located in al-Jalloum district of the Ancient city of Aleppo, Syria. It is built in 1124 on the site of Aleppo's Great Byzantine Cathedral of Saint Helena of the 5th century, where, according to tradition, a Roman temple once stood. Saint Helena, mother of Constantine the Great, built a great Byzantine cathedral there.

When the Crusaders were pillaging the surrounding countryside during the siege of Aleppo in 1124, the city's chief judge, Ibn al-Khashshab, started to convert the cathedral into a mosque during the reign of Belek Ghazi. In 1149, Nur al-Din converted the building into a madrasah; an Islamic-religious school for the followers of the Hanafi madhab.

Parts of the 5th century Christian construction were turned into an Islamic school. It is also known for its fine mihrab.

== Gallery ==
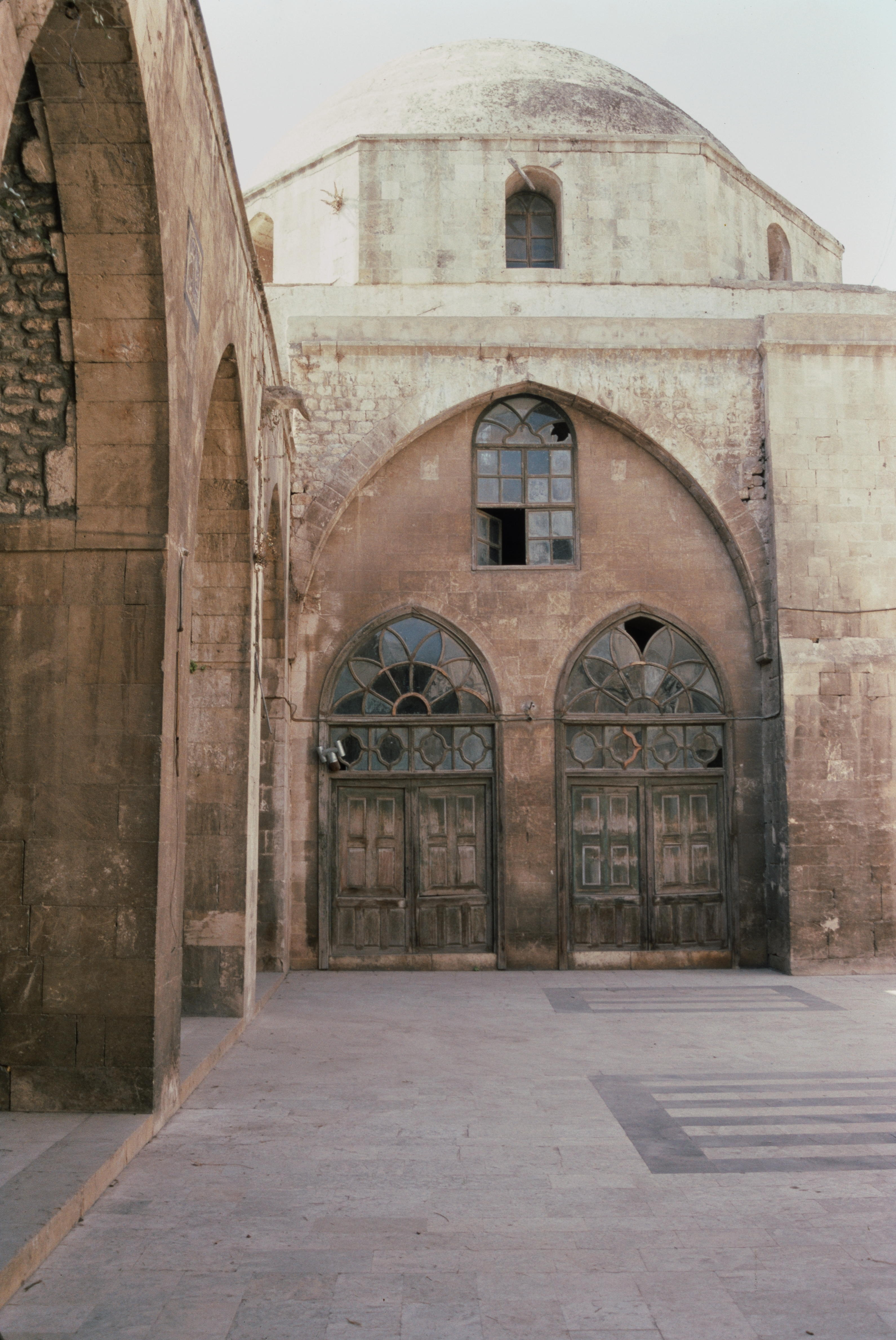
courtyard's eastern façade

interior

columns

== See also ==
- Al-Firdaws Madrasa
- Al-Sultaniyah Madrasa
- Al-Uthmaniyah Madrasa
- Al-Zahiriyah Madrasa
- Khusruwiyah Mosque
- Ancient City of Aleppo
