= Pondok Pesantren Millenium Alfina =

Madrasa in East Java, Indonesia

Location
- Merdeka Timur Street, PO Box 245, Desa Lengkong Kecamatan Lengkong Nganjuk, Jawa, Timur; Indonesia
- 7.53149°S 112.07859°E

Information
- Type: Pondok Pesantren
- Motto: "Pillars, Compact, Keja Just Good, Honest, Amanah, Efficient and hard work"
- School district: Jawa Timur
- Principal: KH. Adi Sutrisno
- Grades: -
- Enrollment: -
- Colors: white and green
- Newspaper: Nuansa Persada

Pondok Pesantren Millenium Alfina is a co-educational boarding school of the Indonesia Institute of Islamic Dawah in East Java, Indonesia. It opened in 2000. Current enrollment is c. 200, with a 20:1 student-teacher ratio.

Instruction is conducted in the Javanese language, and centers on the Quran and Hadith.
