= Pondok Pesantren Walibarokah Burengan Banjaran Kediri =

Madrasa in Kediri, East Java, Indonesia

Location
- Jl HOS Cokroaminoto no.195 Kediri, East Java; Indonesia

Information
- Type: Pondok Pesantren
- Motto: "Pillars: cohesive, cooperative, honest, trustworthy, efficient and hard-working"
- Established: 1950
- School district: Kediri
- Superintendent: Marine Lt. Col. (Ret.) Abdul Syukur
- Principal: Sunarto
- Grades: -
- Enrollment: -
- Color(s): white and green
- Newspaper: Nuansa Persada
- Website: Website Resmi

Pondok Pesantren Walibarokah Burengan Banjaran Kediri (Walibarokah Islamic Boarding School) is a pesantren (Islamic boarding school) located in Kediri, East Java. Run by the Wali Barokah Foundation, the school was founded in 1950 by Nurhasan Al Ubaidah, who initially gave Koran recital lessons to 25 pupils at a mosque in the village of Burengan, Kediri district. Nurhasan later bought a house adjacent to the mosque, which developed into Burengan Banjaran Kediri Islamic Boarding School.

Toward the end of 1971, Nurhasan's health was declining, so the school's management came under the Islamic Employees Foundation (LEMKARI, currently LDII), led by Bachroni Hartanto.

Under the management of LEMKARI, the school underwent further development, including construction of the DMC building, the Wali Barokah Building (the main block for classes) and the 99-meter high Asmaul Husna minaret, which has a gold-plated dome and can be seen from various corners of Kediri. Asmaul Husna is listed as the tallest minaret in Indonesia.

== Facilities ==
The school has a campus of 3.4 hectares and a capacity for 2,000 students and about 50 administrators and teachers. Boys and girls are accommodated in different buildings separated by a mosque.

The school's auditorium was inaugurated by former housing minister Siswono Yudo Husodo.
