= Madrasa Al Husseiniya Al Sughra =

Madrasa in Tunis, Tunisia

Coordinates: 36.794367°N 10.172368°E

Madrasa Al Husseiniya Al Sughra (Arabic: المدرسة الحسينية الصغرى) or the Small Husainid Madrasa is a tunisian madrasah in the Medina of Tunis.

== Location ==
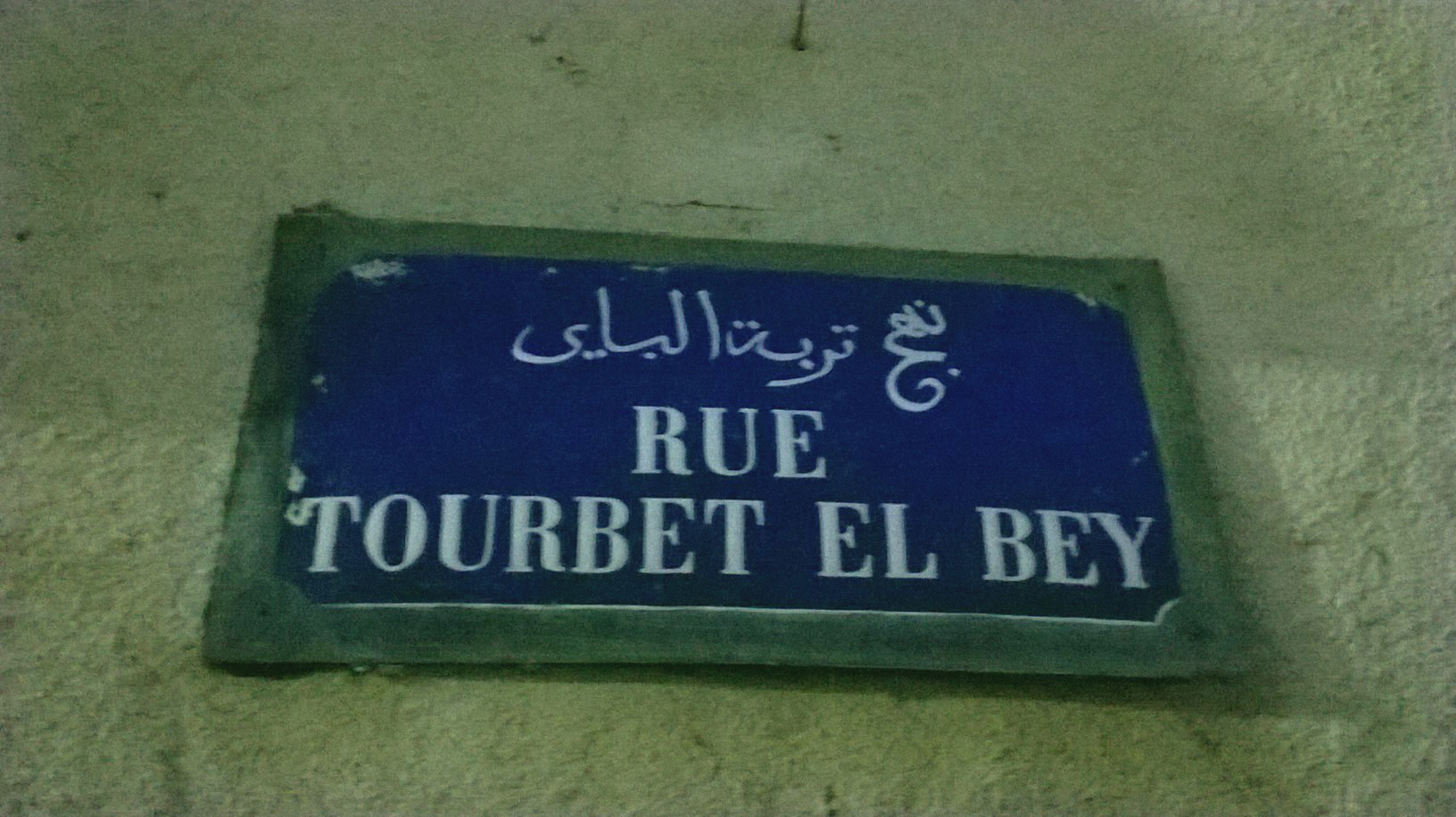
Metallic plaque of Tourbet El Bey Street

The madrasa is located in 60 Tourbet El Bey Street, next to the small Mausoleum of the Husainid Dynasty also known as Tourbet El Fellari.

== History ==
It was the first madrasa to be built in the Medina of Tunis during the Husainid era few years after Al-Husayn I ibn Ali's accession to the throne. The construction work started in 1708 and finished 2 years later.

== Students ==
The madrasa used to host 10 Malikite students coming from interior regions of the country. Each one of them had its own room. But by the 20th century, the number of students increased and reached 21. It had its own Imam and a cheikh to teach the students.
