= Madrasa El Mettichia =

Madrasa in Tunis, Tunisia

Coordinates: 36.804903°N 10.165245°E

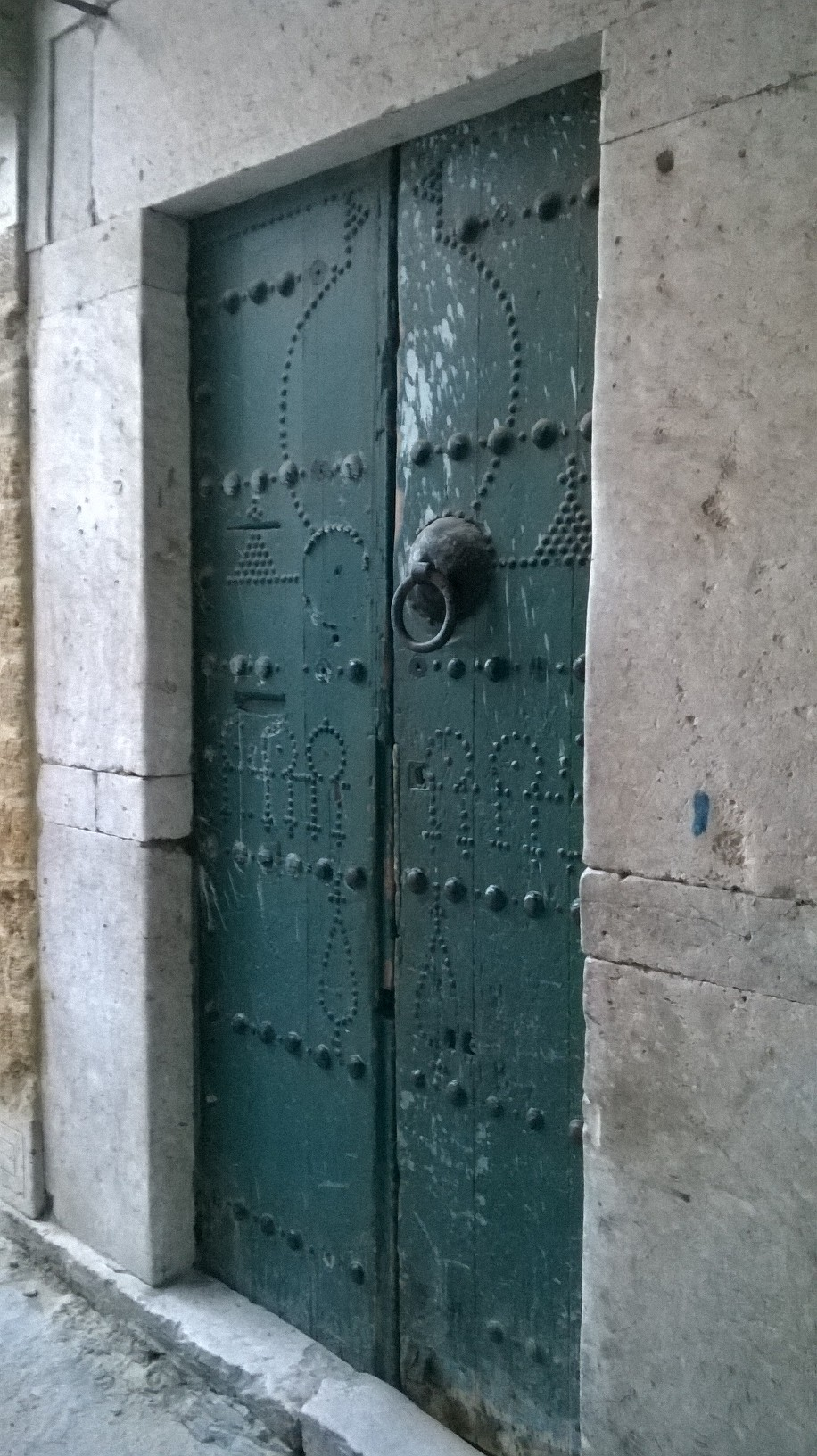
Entrance of the madrasa

Madrasa El Mettichia (Arabic: المدرسة المتيشية) is one of the madrasahs of Tunis.

== Location ==
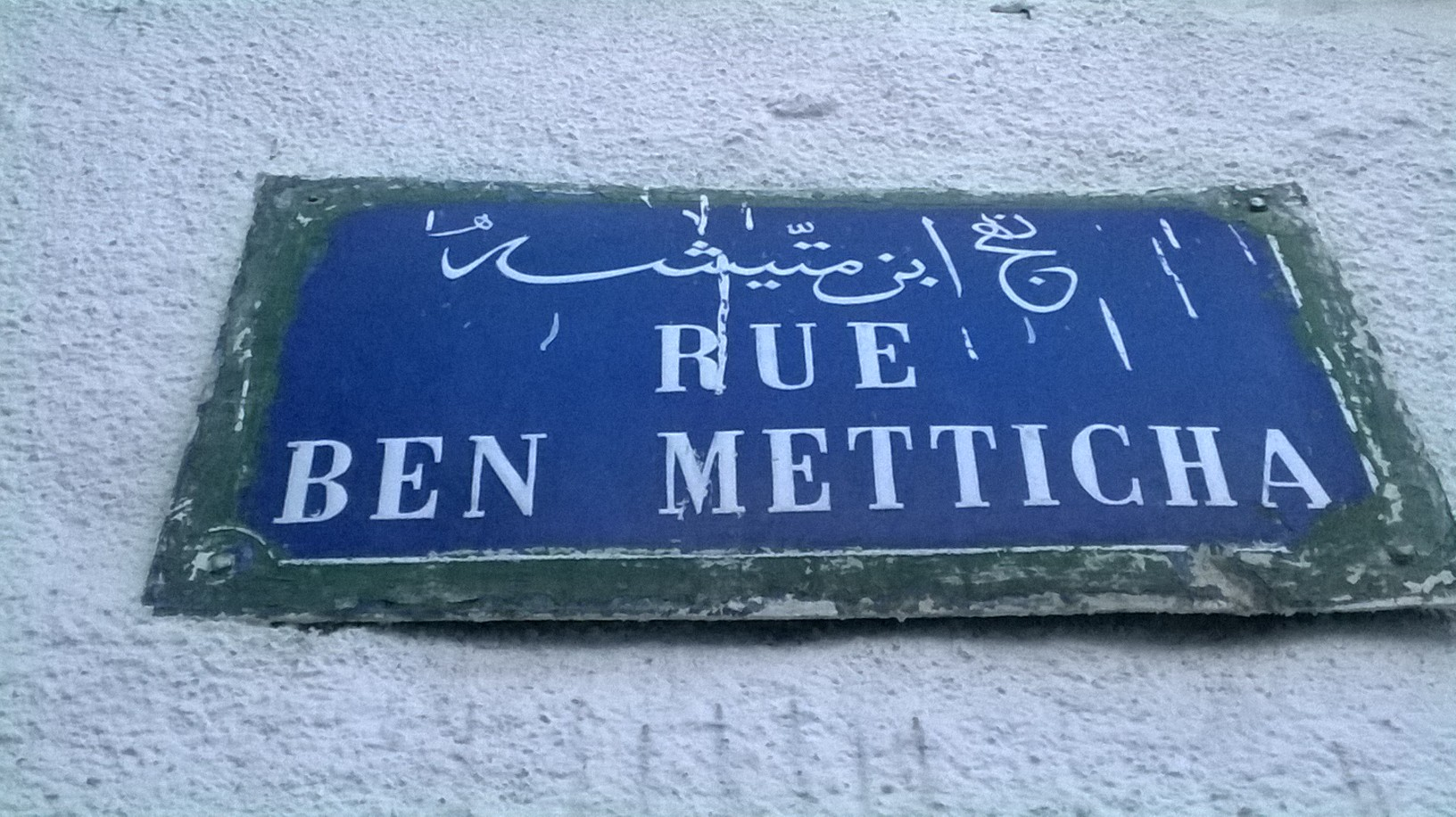
Metallic plaque indicating the Ben Metticha Street

The madrasa is located in the southwest of the suburb of Bab Souika, between Ben Metticha and Bou Sandel streets.

== History ==
Madrasa El Mettichia was built in 1705 by Ahmed Lagha with the sober architecture of the Hafsid dynasty.

== Description ==
The building has a typical architecture: a courtyard with two porticos that gives access to the rooms and the prayer room. The latrines are separated from the courtyard by a small courtyard.

Nowadays, the madrasa is in a bad state.

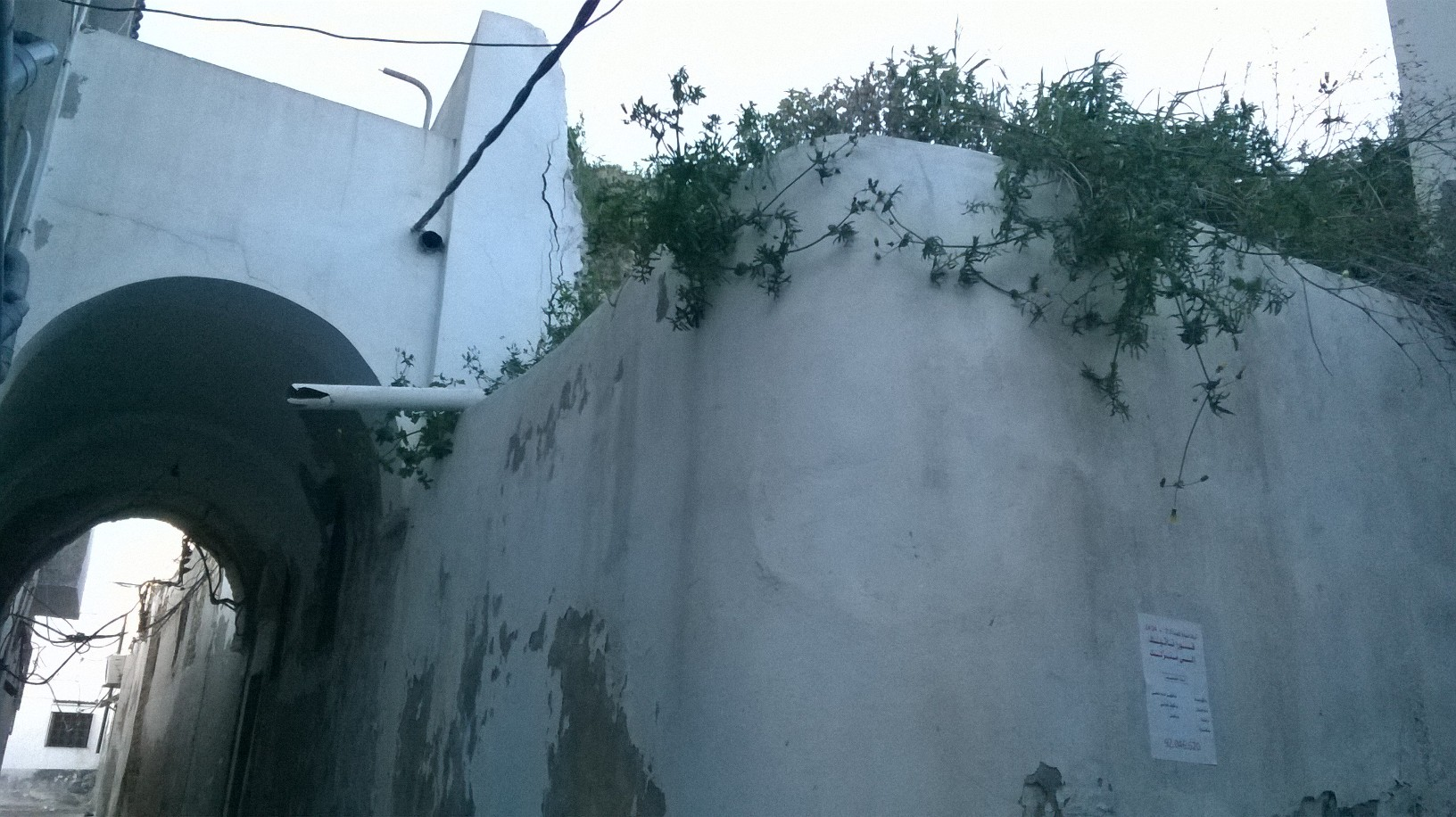
View of the madrasa with its northern sabat (covered pathway)

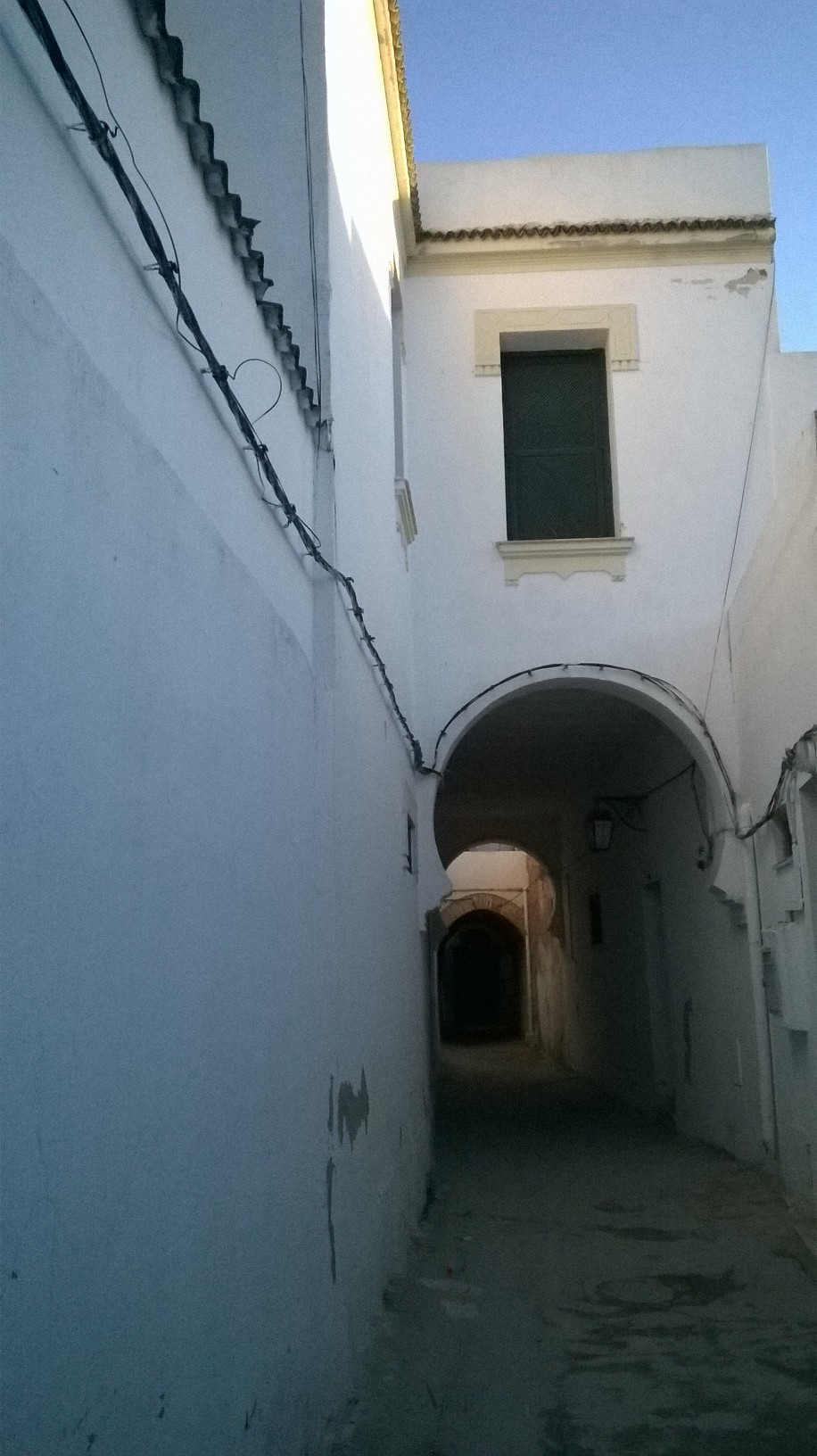
View of the southern sabat
