= Madrasa Andaloussiya =

Madrasa in Tunis, Tunisia

Coordinates: 36.801226°N 10.173994°E

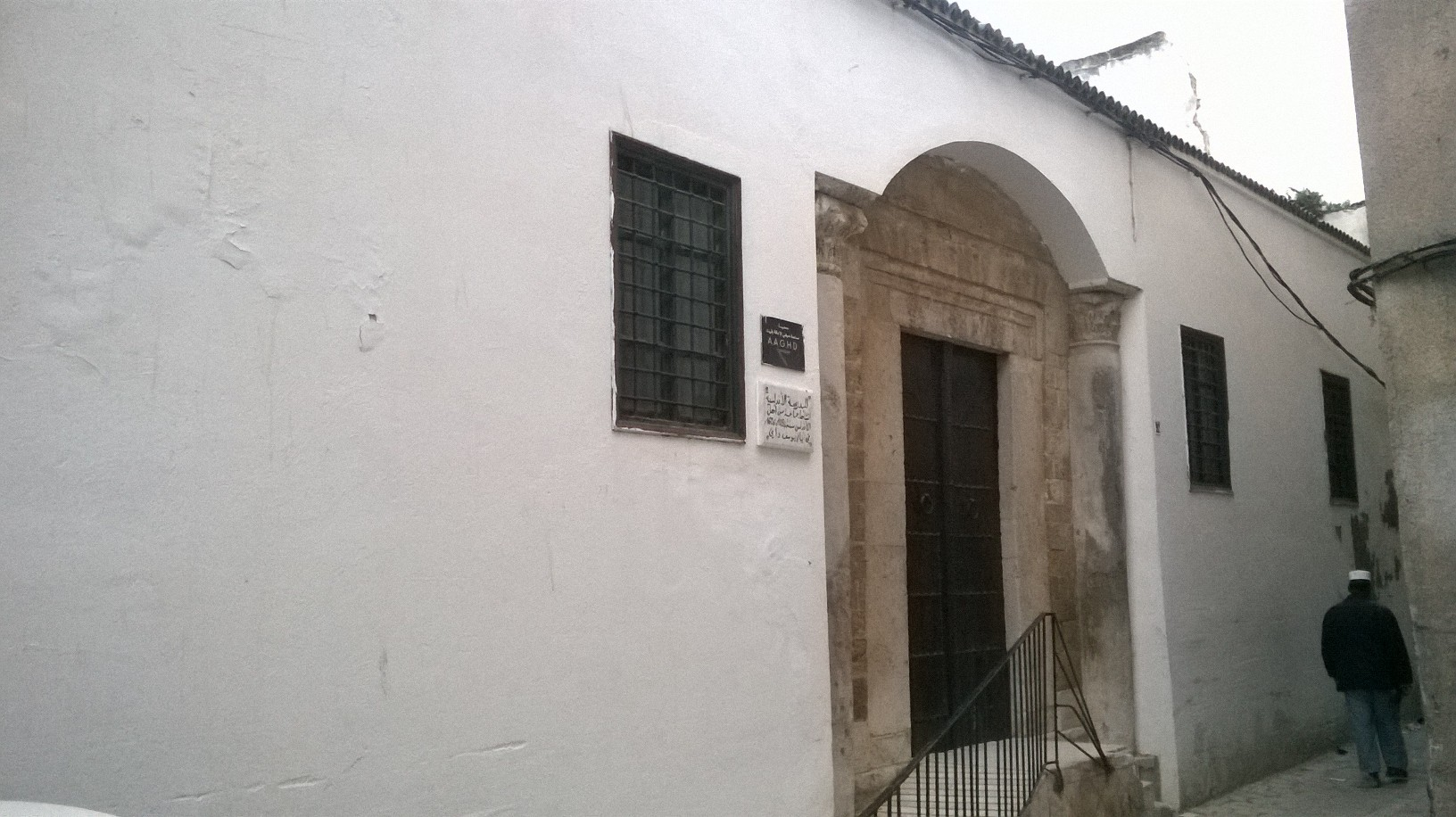
Facade of Madrasa Andaloussiya

Madrasa Andaloussiya (Arabic: المدرسة الأندلسية) also known as the Madrasa El Younsiya, is a tunisian Madrasah in the Medina of Tunis. It is also called Madrasa of Sidi El Ajmi because it is close to his zaouia.

== Location ==
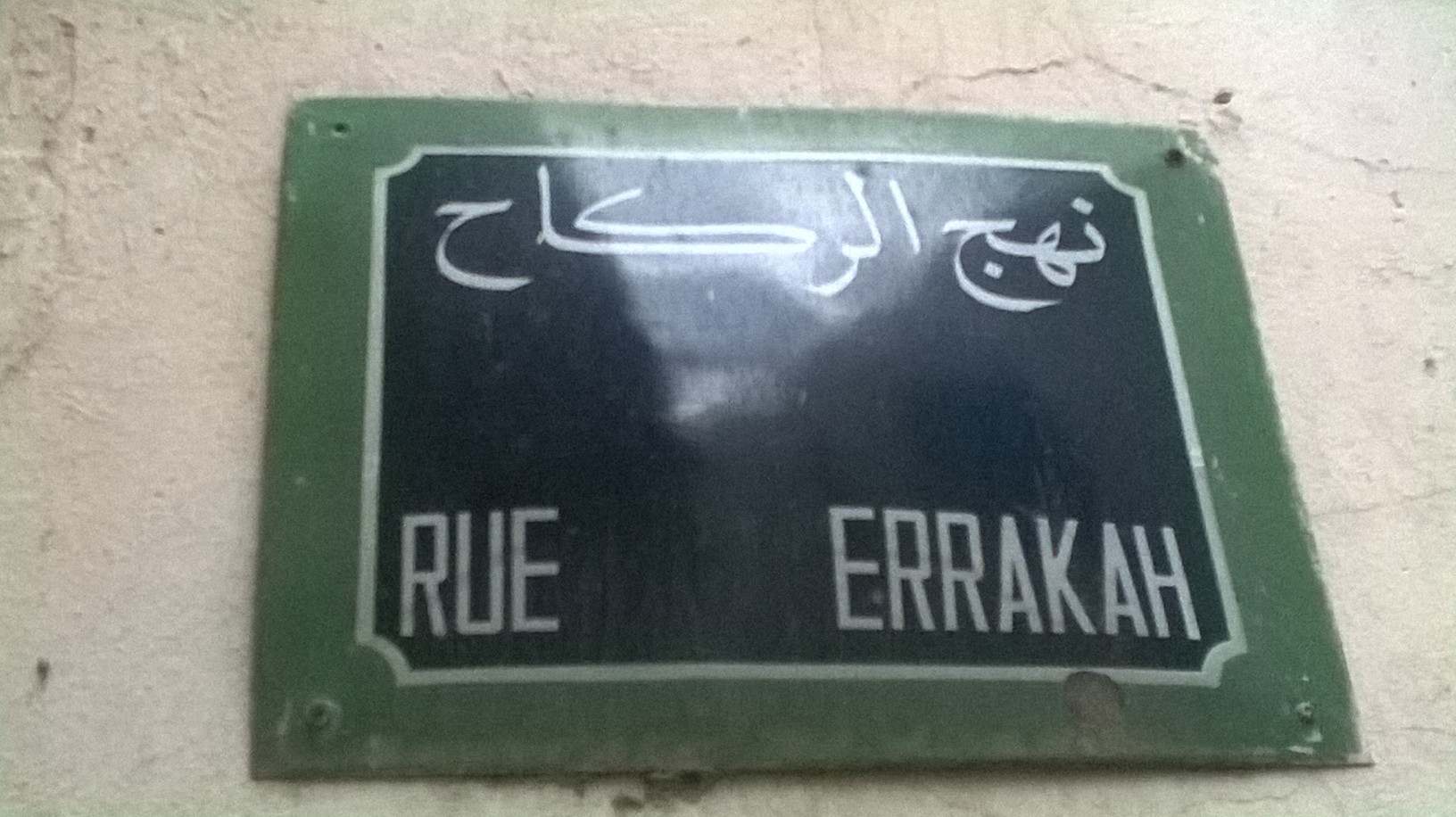
Metallic plaque of Errakah Street

It is located in R+Errakah Street, in the jewish hood El Hara near the mausoleum of the saint Abi Ahmed Mohamed Younes also known as Sidi Younes in the Medina.

== History ==
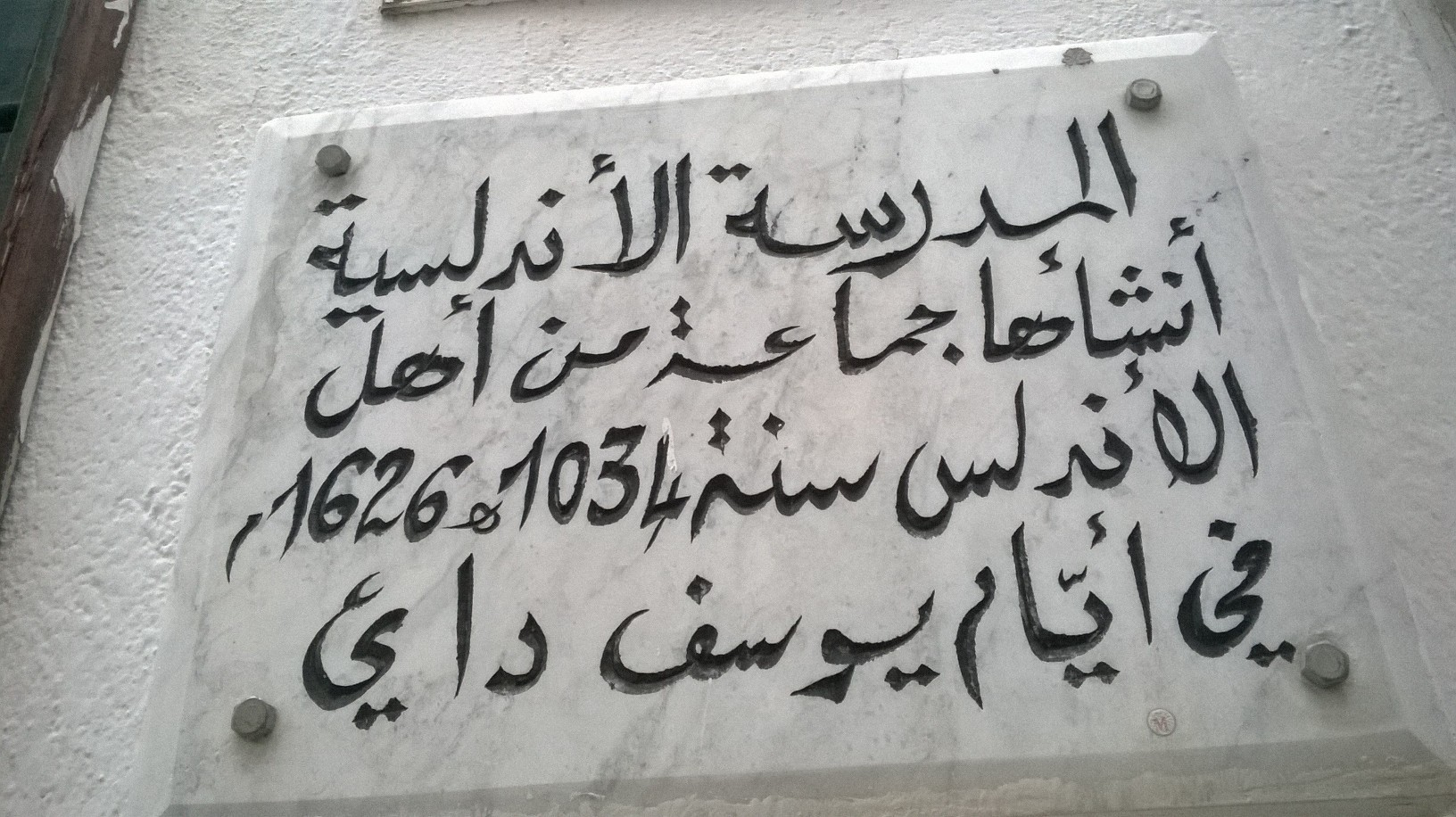
Commemorative plaque of the Madrasa

The madrasa was built by the group of muslims who came to Tunis after getting expelled from Spain following the rules of Philip III of Spain in 1609.

This community that contributed to the development of the kingdom on social, economic and cultural scales, built the Soubhan Allah Mosque in Bab Souika as well.

== Current situation ==
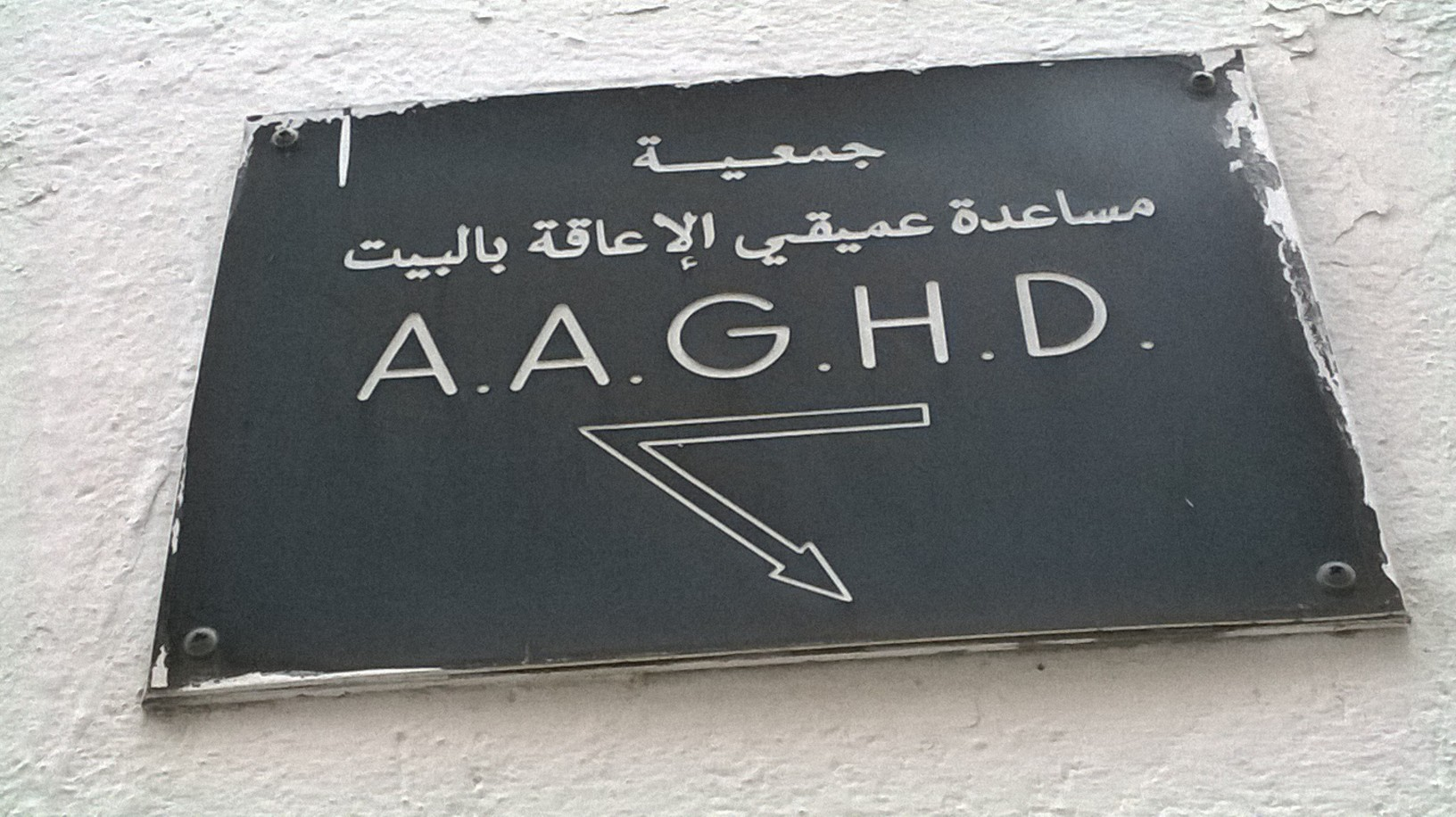
Panel of the association for disabled people's assistance

Nowadays, the madrasa is the office of an association for disabled people.
