= Madrasa of Zawiya El Bokria =

Madrasa in Tunis, Tunisia

Madrasa of Zawiya El Bokria (Arabic: مدرسة الزاوية البكرية) is one of the madrasahs of the medina of Tunis.

== History ==
It was built during the Hafsid dynasty. The name of this madrasa come from Abou Bakr, one of the descendants of Uthman.

It contains a madrasa and a mausoleum, which is the same at Madrasa Marjania.

== El Bokri Family ==
Many descendants of this family became great imams of the Al-Zaytuna Mosque such as Ali Tej El Arifin Bokri.
