= Madrasa Al Habibia Al Sughra =

Madrasa in Tunis, Tunisia

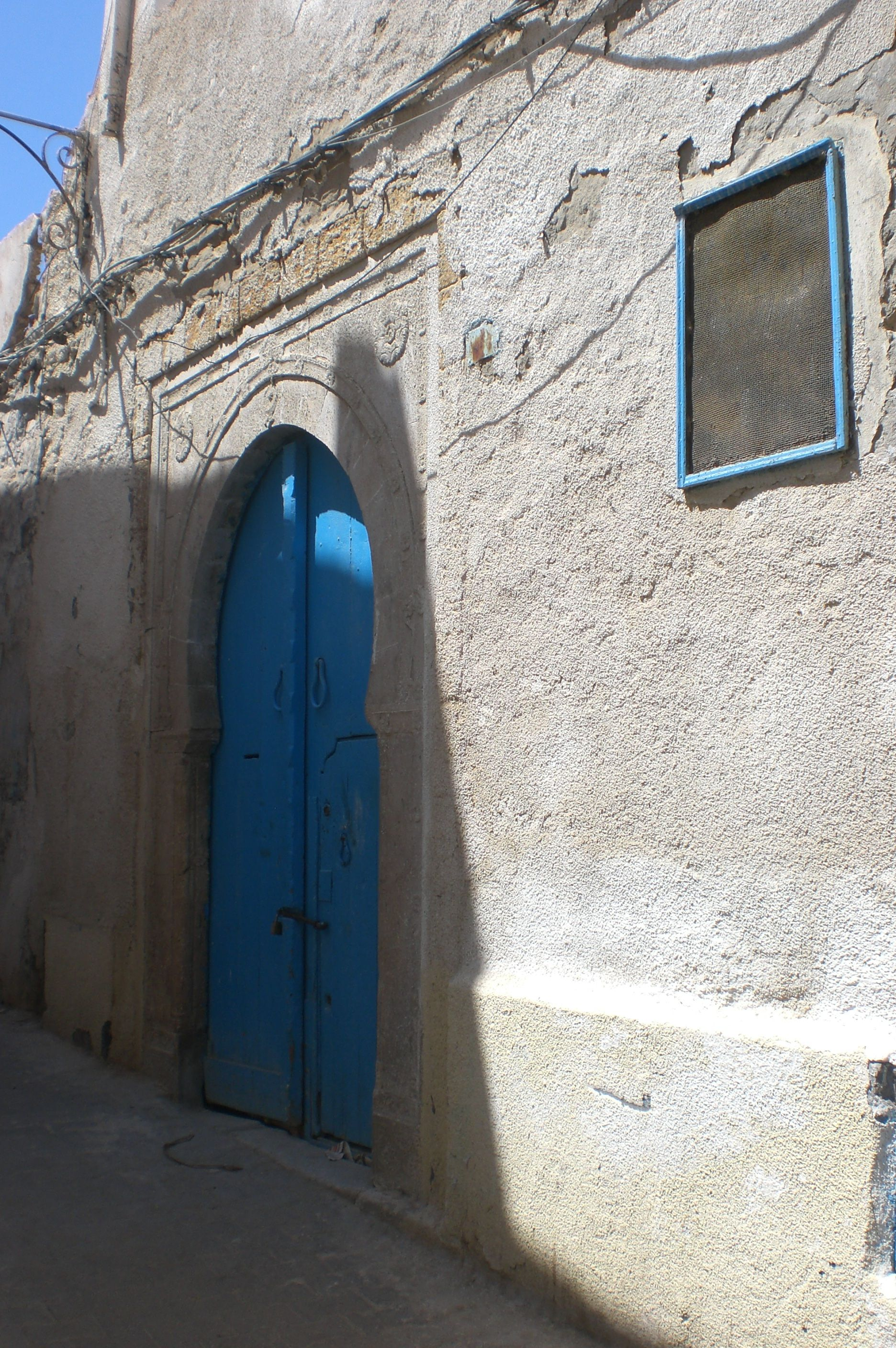
View of the madrasa from the outside

Madrasa Al Habibia Al Sughra (Arabic: المدرسة الحبيبية الصغرى) is one of the madrasahs of the medina of Tunis. It was built in 1927 by Muhammad VI al-Habib, from whom its name is derived. This madrasa is one of the newest schools of the medina of Tunis.

In addition to its educational role, the madrasa accommodates the students of the University of Ez-Zitouna.
