= Büyük Ağa Medrese =

Madrasa in Amasya, Turkey

Büyük Ağa Medresesi
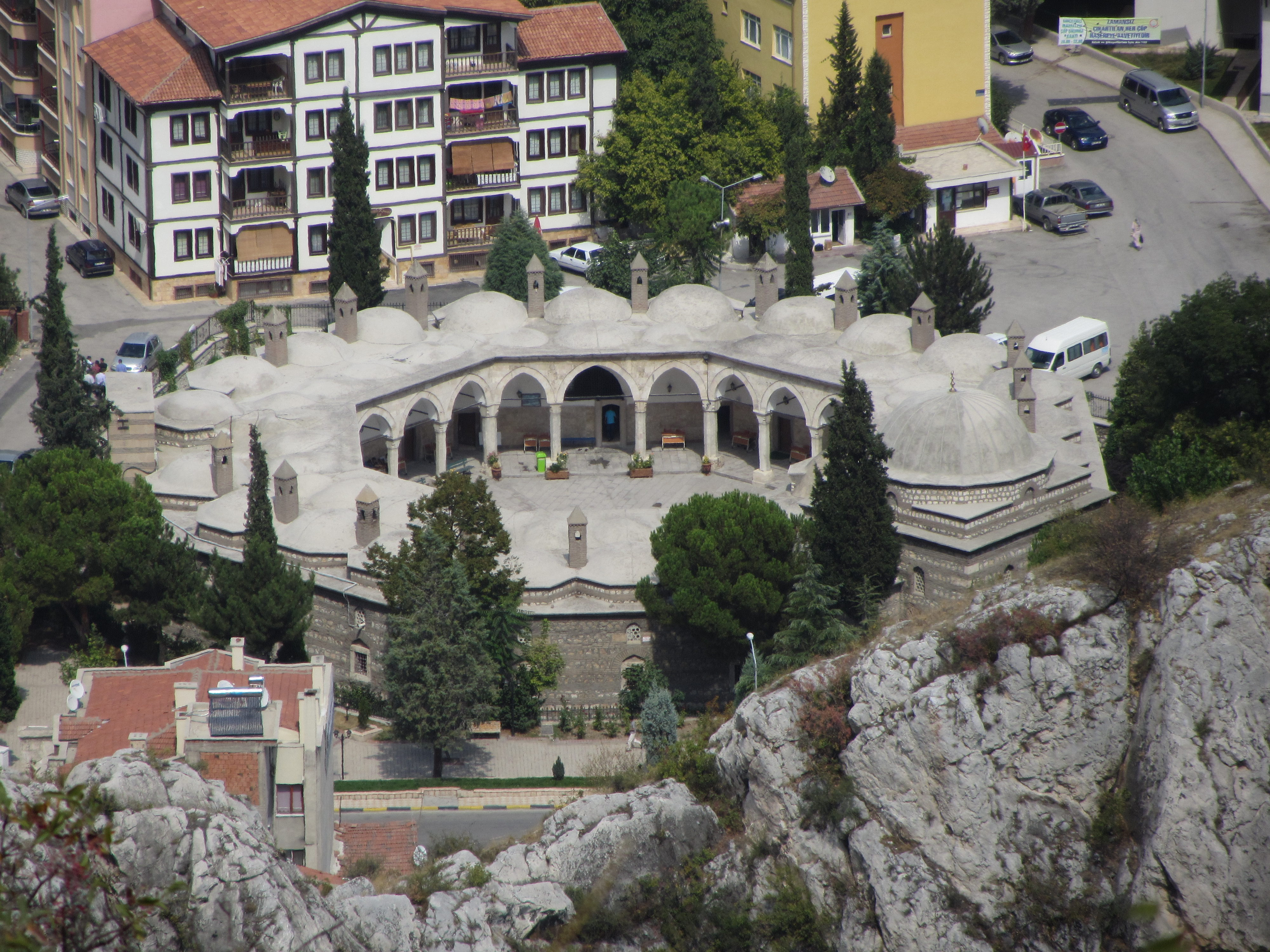

Religion
- Affiliation: Islam
- Region: Black Sea Region

Location
- Location: Amasya, Turkey
- Interactive map of Büyük Ağa Medresesi
- Coordinates: 40.6586°N 35.8350°E

Architecture
- Type: Medrese
- Style: Ottoman architecture
- Completed: 1488

Büyük Ağa Medresesi or Kapı Ağa Medresesi is a historical 15th century medrese in Amasya, Turkey. The complex was built in 1488 on the order of the Kapı Ağası (chief of the eunuchs that worked in the harem) Hüseyin Ağa during the reign of the Ottoman sultan Bayezid II.

== Building ==
The medrese has a unique octagonal plan used for the first time in this building and consists of the student rooms, each covered by a small dome, around an octagonal colonnaded courtyard. The largest domed room was used as the main lecture room and now for the training of local youth to become hafız.

== Gallery ==
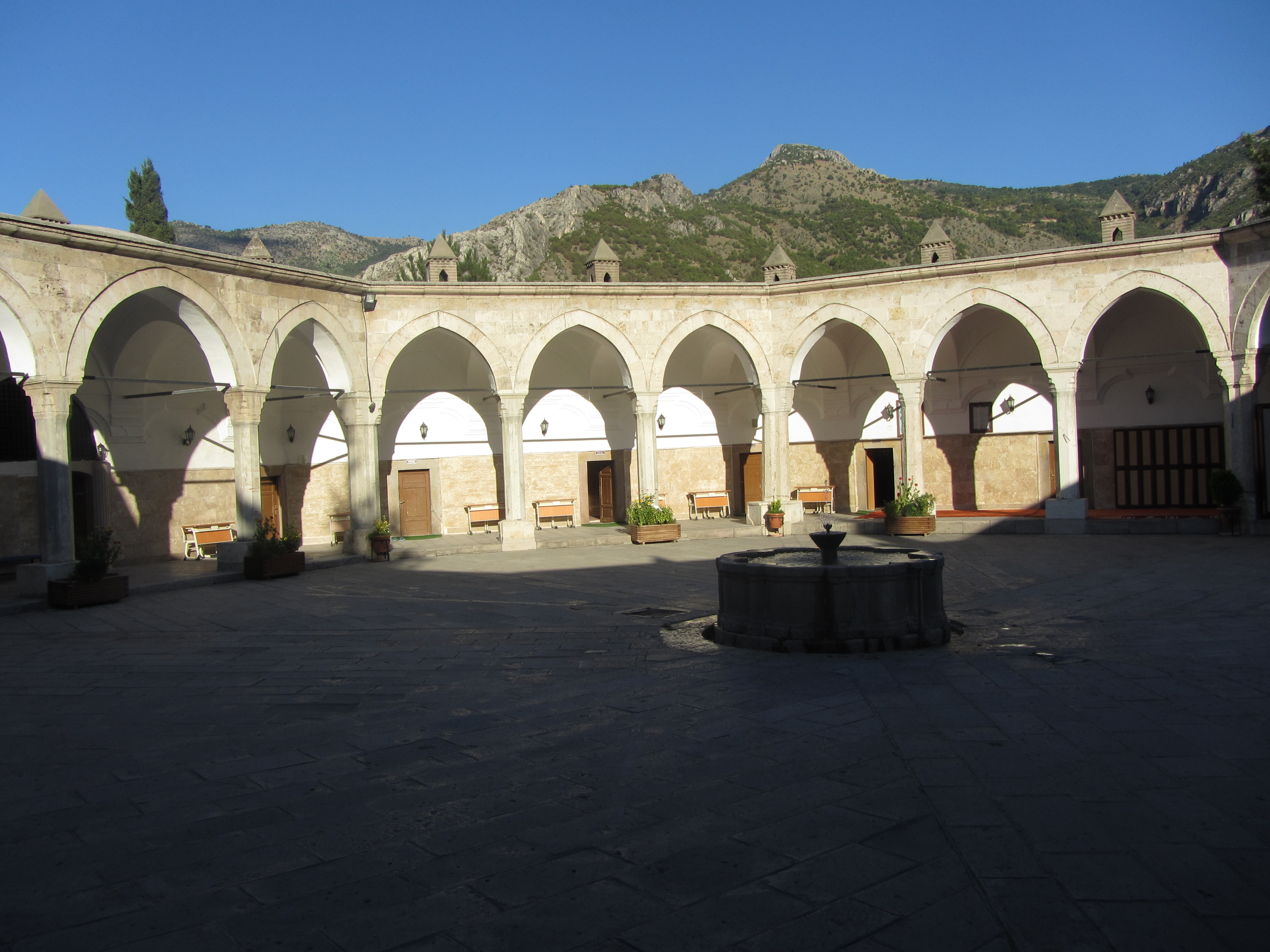
The courtyard and the student rooms
