= Pondok Pesantren Minhaajurrosyidiin Jakarta =

Madrasa in Jakarta, Indonesia

- Kelurahan Lubang Buaya, Jakarta Timur, DKI Jakarta; Indonesia

Information
- Type: Pondok Pesantren
- Motto: "Lembaga pendidikan sesuai dengan Alqur'an dan Assunah"
- Established: 1995
- School district: Jakarta
- Chairman: Komjen Pol (Purn) Drs. H. Nurfaizi, MM
- Principal: Ir. H. Muhammad Asy’ari Akbar,
- Grades: -
- Enrollment: -
- Website: minhaajurrosyidiin.wordpress.com

Yayasan Pondok Pesantren Minhaajurrosyidiin Jakarta was established in 1995 by retired military and police are concerned about the increase in morals and manners of the people of Indonesia who fit the Qur'an and the Shari'a Alhadits The Prophet.

Chairman of the Foundation Ponpes Minhaajurrosyidiin at that time retired army lieutenant colonel. KH Zubaidi Umar, SH up to 2004. To implement the program of religious education at boarding school then in the form of Executive Daily Boarding Schools, Boarding Schools as chief executive of the Ir. KH. Muh. Akbar Ash'ari, MM.
