= Madrasa El Bechiria =

Madrasa in Tunis, Tunisia

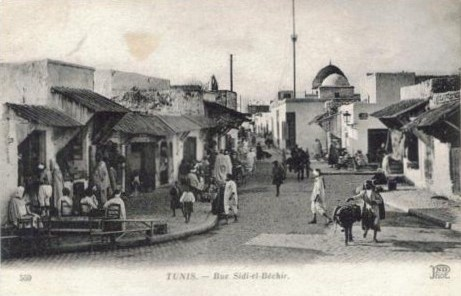
An ancient post card showing Sidi El Bechir.

Madrasa El Bechiria (Arabic: المدرسة البشيرية) is one of the madrasahs of the medina of Tunis., which was constructed during the Husainid Dynasty and was attached to a zawiya.

== Etymology ==
The madrasa is named after Sheikh Mohamed Al Bechir Al Zouaoui (Arabic: محمد البشير الزواوي), who was an important Rahmaniyya tariqa scholar, who died in Tunis in 1826.

== Location ==
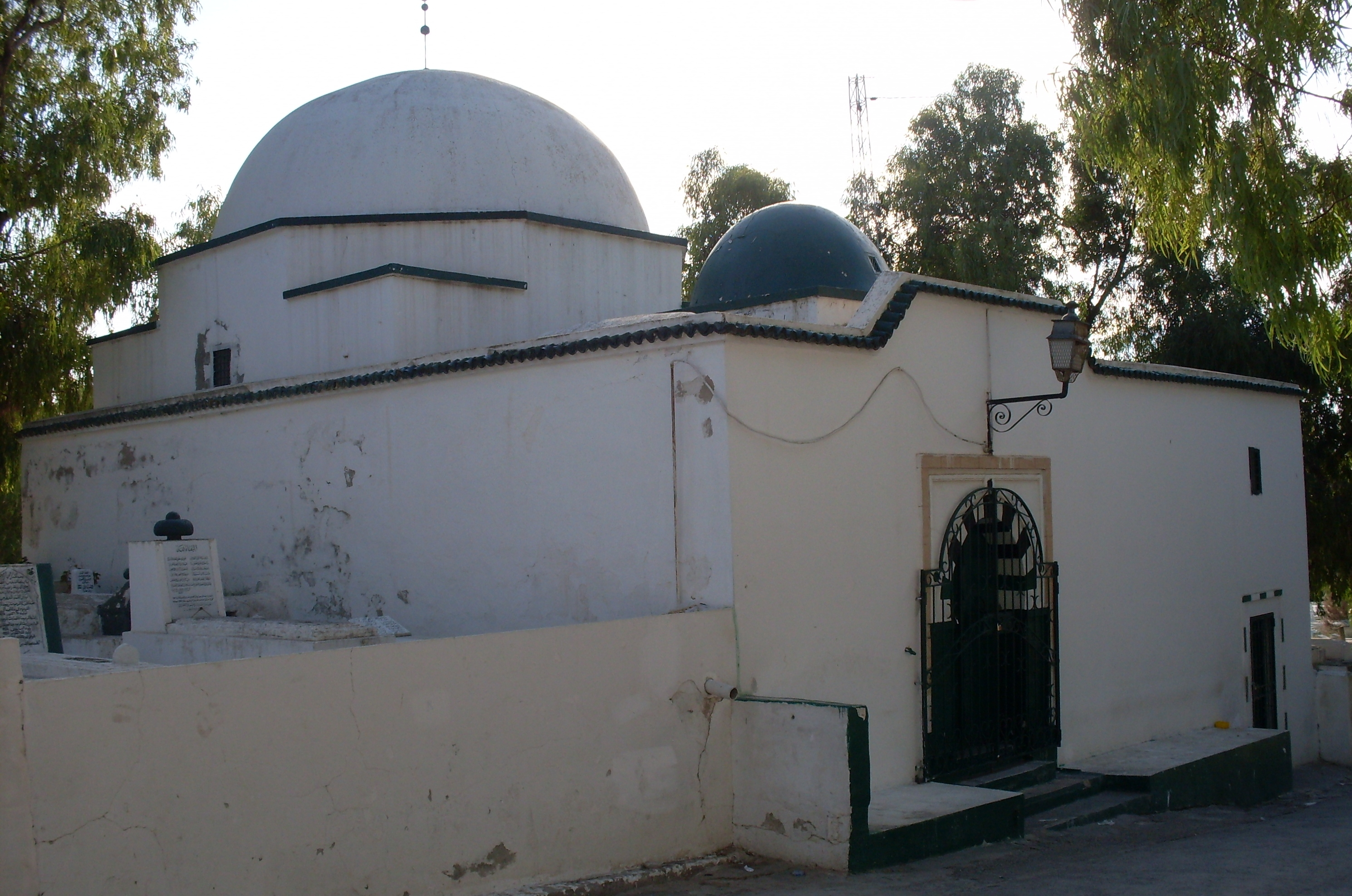
A view of the Sidi El Bechir mausoleum at the Djellaz cemetery of Tunis.

The madrasa is located on the Sidi El Bechir Street, in the southern suburb of the medina of Tunis.

== History ==
The madrasa was dedicated to students from the Zouaoua tribe who followed the Rahmaniyya tariqa. It was built with a mausoleum in 1824 (1240 Hijri) by Al-Husayn II ibn Mahmud. It was managed by the son of Sheikh Al Bechir after his death.

== Description ==
The madrasa contains seven rooms and a mosque.

== Evolution ==
After the Tunisian independence, this madrasa was destroyed as part of restorations on Sidi El Bechir Street.

== Students ==
Among students of this madarsa, we can find the historian Ahmad ibn Abi Diyaf who assisted tafsir classes (Quran explanations) taught by Al Bechir in person.

== Bibliography ==
- Mohamed Belkhodja (1939). Tārīkh maʻālim al-tawḥīd fī al-qadīm wa-fī al-Jadīd (in Arabic). Tunis: al-Maṭbaʻah al-Tūnisīyah.
