= Madrasa El Kacemia =

Madrasa in Tunis, Tunisia

Madrasa El Kacemia (Arabic: المدرسة القاسمية) is one of the madrasahs of the medina of Tunis, which was constructed during the reign of the Husainid Dynasty.

== Etymology ==
The madrasa's name is derived from its owner, the saint Al Haj Kacem Ibn Al Haj Ali Ben Youssef Al Jerbi (Arabic: الحاج قاسم ابن الحاج علي بن يوسف الجربي), a Sheikh who died in 1936 (1355 Hijri).

== Location ==
The madrasa is located at the Sidi Sridek (Arabic: سيدي سريدك) mausoleum.

== History ==
It was inaugurated in 1928 (1347 Hijri) by Muhammad VI al-Habib, who granted Al-Haj Kacem the Order of Glory in appreciation for the construction of this madrasa.

== Description ==
The madrasa includes a student housing and a Quranic elementary school (kouttab) for children.

== Bibliography ==
- Mohamed Belkhodja (1939). Tārīkh maʻālim al-tawḥīd fī al-qadīm wa-fī al-Jadīd (in Arabic). Tunis: al-Maṭbaʻah al-Tūnisīyah.
