= Al-Sahiba Madrasa =

Madrasa in Damascus, Syria

- الْمَدْرَسَة الصَّاحِبِيَّة
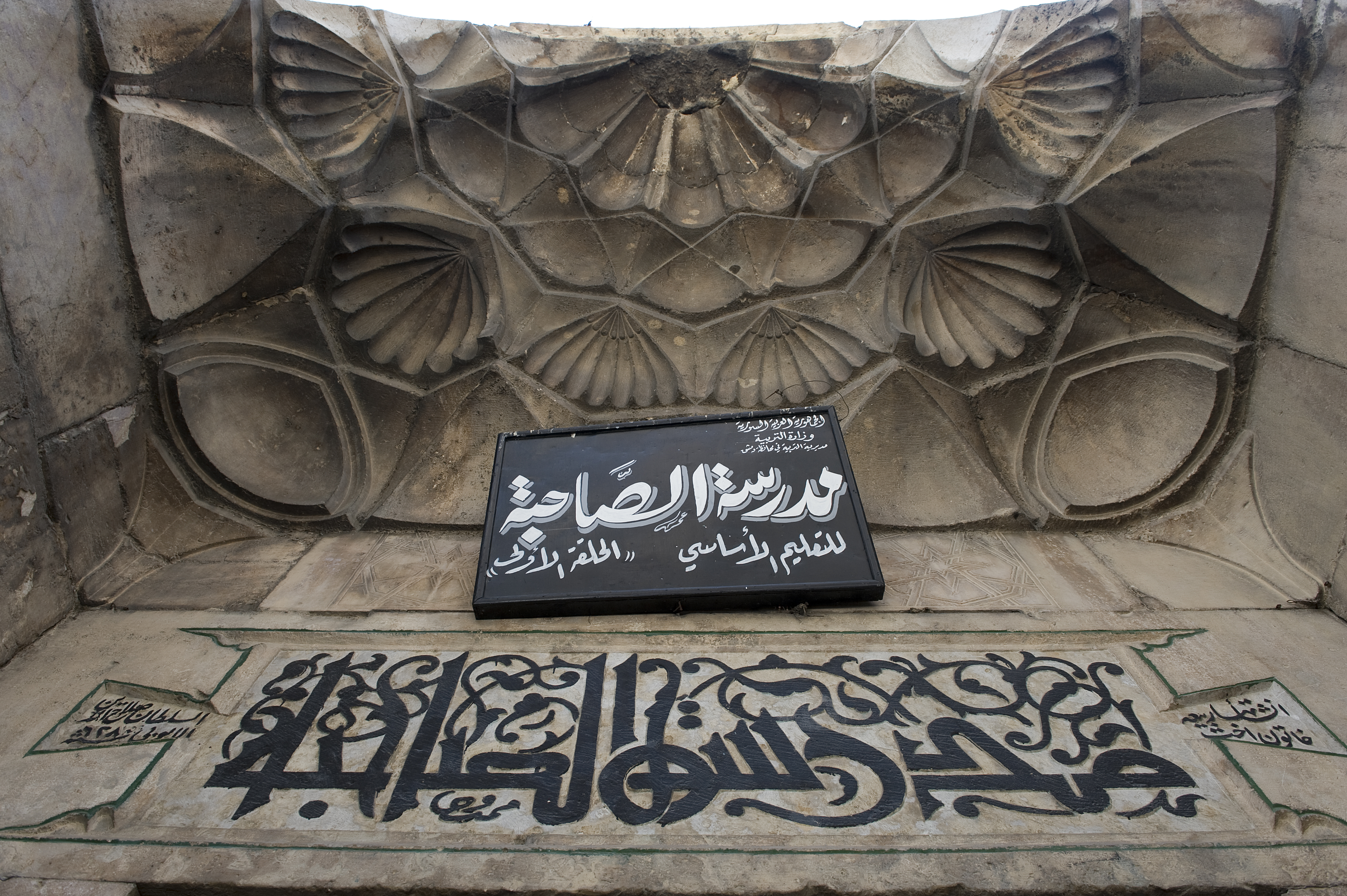
- entrance of the madrasa

Location
- Al-Salihiyah quarter Damascus; Syria

Information
- Type: madrasa
- Established: 1245 AD
- Founder: Rabia Khatun
- Campus: Urban
- Affiliation: Islamic

Al-Sahiba Madrasa (Arabic: الْمَدْرَسَة الصَّاحِبِيَّة, romanized: al-Madrasah aṣ-Ṣāhibīyah) is a 13th-century madrasa located in Damascus, Syria.

== See also ==
- Al-Adiliyah Madrasa
- Az-Zahiriyah Library
- Nur al-Din Madrasa
