= Madrasa Caid Mourad =

Madrasa in Tunis, Tunisia

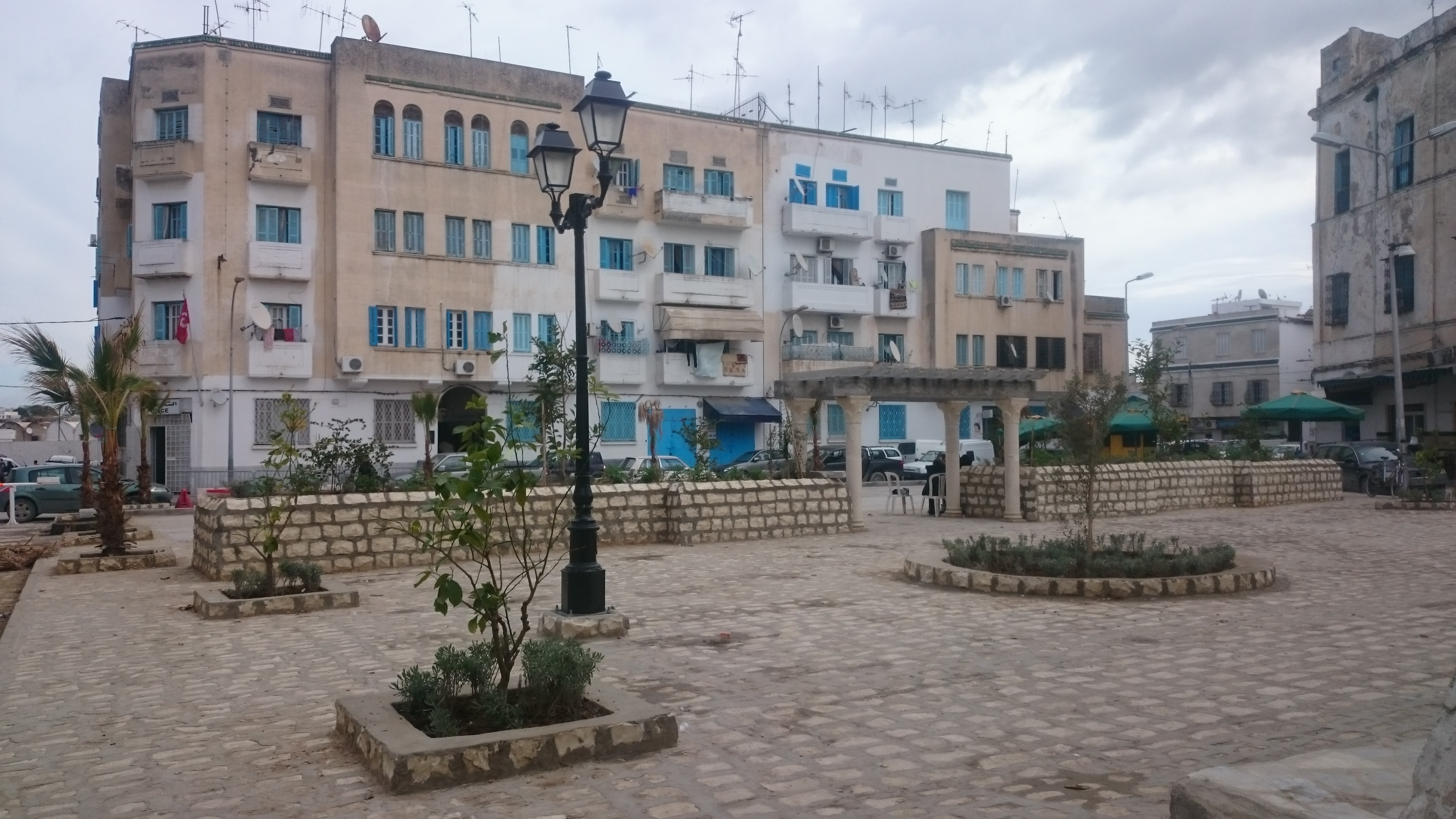
View from the Hafsia urban quarter, which used to be known as Hara.

Madrasa Caid Mourad (Arabic: مدرسة القائد مراد) is one of the madrasahs of the medina of Tunis, which was constructed during the reign of the Muradid dynasty.

== Location ==
It was also known as the Swari Madrasa, since it is situated at the Swari alley, in the urban quarter named Haouanet Achour and called Hafsia today.

== History ==
The madrasa was built in the year 1682 (1093 Hijri) by caid Mourad Ben Abdallah, a Mamluk of a Muradid prince. It was mainly built to house students of the Hanafi Islamic school.

After the transformation of the Hara urban quarter, the madrasa was completely destroyed in 1936 (1355 Hijri) and tens of its stones are at the Bardo National Museum today, as a witness of its past presence.

== Instructors ==
Among the madrasa's famous instructors were Sheikh Omar Mahjoub and Mufti Mohammed El Kbayle.

== Bibliography ==
- Mohamed Belkhodja (1939). Tārīkh maʻālim al-tawḥīd fī al-qadīm wa-fī al-Jadīd (in Arabic). Tunis: al-Maṭbaʻah al-Tūnisīyah.
