= Pondok Pesantren Waria Al-Fatah =

Madrasa in Yogyakarta, Indonesia

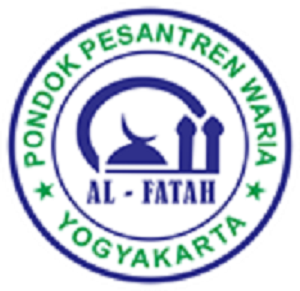
Madrasa logo

Pondok Pesantren Waria Al-Fatah is a Madrasa in Yogyakarta, Indonesia, for waria people. Shinta Ratri founded it with two other waria in 2008, after several waria lives were claimed by the 2006 Yogyakarta earthquake. Ratri believed that the pesantren was the first madrasa for transgender people anywhere in the world.

The madrasa had roughly 40 students and provided housing for about 10 women. In the madrasa, waria can dress as men or women according to their preference during prayers.

The madrasa also provides community education in the hopes of fostering better treatment for waria in Java.

The pesantren was temporarily closed in February 2016 after threats of violence from conservative groups. A raid from the Front Jihad Islam hardline group also factored into the closing. However, in June 2016 it reopened in a different location than before, as the original owner of the school died that year. The school is then in Shinta's Javanese style house.

Founder Shinta Ratri died on 1 February 2023, at the age of 60.
