= Medrese of Mehmet Şakir Paşa =

Madrasa in Nevşehir, Turkey

Madrasa of Mehmed Shakir Pasha
- Mehmet Şakir Paşa Medresesi
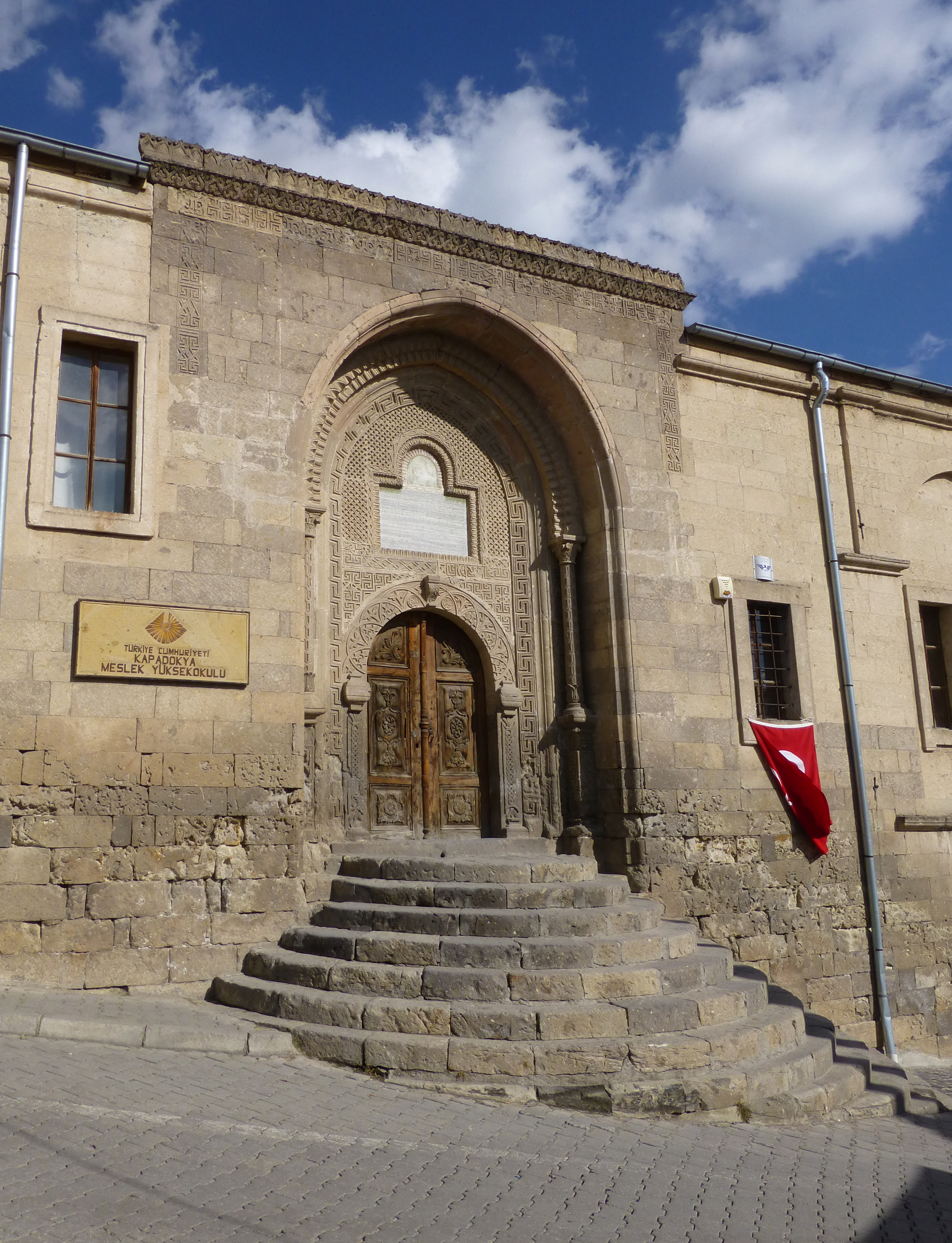
- Main gate of the madrasa.

- Location of the madrasa in Turkey.

Religion
- Affiliation: Islam
- Province: Nevşehir
- Region: Central Anatolia

Location
- Location: Mustafapaşa, Turkey
- Coordinates: 38°35′00″N 34°53′52″E

Architecture
- Type: Madrasa
- Style: Seljuk
- Completed: 1890; 136 years ago

Medrese of Mehmet Şakir Paşa, also known as Madrasa of Mustafapaşa, is a 19th-century madrasa, an Islamic educational institute, in Nevşehir Province, central Turkey. It is also known as a caravanserai.

The madrasa is in Mustafapaşa, formerly Sinasos, in Ürgüp District of Nevşehir Province.

It was built in 1890 by Mehmet Şakir Pasha in the town center. The building was also used as an imaret, a public soup kitchen, and during the Republican era, it was used as carpet market. It was restored in 1982. Currently, it houses a part of Kapodokya Undergraduate School.

It is a U-plan building. There is a seven-line inscription on the main gate. The students' quarters are behind the arched portico.
