= Madrasa Al Jassoussia =

Madrasa in Tunis, Tunisia

Madrasa Al Jassoussia (Arabic: المدرسة الجاسوسية) is one of the madrasahs of the medina of Tunis.

== Etymology ==
The madrasa's name comes from the saint Abi Abdallah Al Jassous (Arabic: أبي عبدالله الجاسوس).

== Location ==
It is located near the mausoleum of Sidi Abou El Ghaith Al Kachech (Arabic: سيدي أبو الغيث القشاش), the Sheikh of the people of Andalusian descent in Tunis, in Souk El Blat.

== History ==
The madrasa is mostly known as Madrasa Al Dassoussia since the word Al Jassous, which means "spy", could also be pronounced dassous in the dialect of Tunis. This name came up in 1876 (1293 Hijri).

It is believed that a Husainid prince dedicated eight shops located at Al Azzaine as waqf to cover the financial needs of this madrasa, which was dedicated to students of the Maliki Islamic school.

== Bibliography ==
- Mohamed Belkhodja (1939). Tārīkh maʻālim al-tawḥīd fī al-qadīm wa-fī al-Jadīd (in Arabic). Tunis: al-Maṭbaʻah al-Tūnisīyah.
