= Al-Fathiyah Madrasa =

Madrasa in Damascus, Syria

- الْمَدْرَسَة الْفَتْحِيَّة
- Damascus; Syria

Information
- Type: madrasa
- Established: 1743
- Founder: Fethi Al-Defterdar
- Campus: Urban
- Affiliation: Islamic

Al-Fathiyah Madrasa (Arabic: الْمَدْرَسَة الْفَتْحِيَّة, romanized: al-Madrasah al-Fatḥīyah) is a madrasa complex in Damascus, Syria. It was built in 1743 by an Ottoman official named Fethi Al-Defterdar.

== See also ==
- Al-Adiliyah Madrasa
- Az-Zahiriyah Library
