= Pondok Pesantren Gading Mangu Perak Jombang =

Madrasa in Jombang, East Java, Indonesia

- desa Gading Mangu Perak Jombang Jawa Timur; Indonesia

Information
- Type: Pondok Pesantren
- Motto: "to the missionary of very and ethical"
- Established: 1952
- School district: Jombang
- Superintendent: -
- Principal: KH. Ahmad Fathoni
- Grades: -
- Enrollment: -
- Colors: White and Green
- Newspaper: Nuansa Persada
- Feeder schools: educate the younger generation become preachers and mubalighot reliable mastering the Quran and Hadith as well as noble, high intellect and the global perspective
- Website: Web Pondok Pesantren Gading Mangu Perak Jombang

Pondok Pesantren Gading Mangu Perak Jombang is an Islamic religious education in Gading Mangu, Jombang, East Java Province. in Indonesia, The school is managed by Yayasan Budi Utomo.

The school emphasizes the teaching of Al-Quran Al-Hadith and the formation of Karimah akhlakul.

Pondok Pesantren Gading Mangu currently accommodates 3,500 students, both girls and boys, from all over Indonesia. Of the total number of 1139 students of the school at SMU Budi Utomo, 917 people sat on the bench SMK Budi Utomo and 806 people became junior high school students Budi Utomo.

Operating since 1952, the scholl has dormitories, hostel building, hall, guest house, kitchen and activity center of the mosque Baitul Antiq

== Brief history ==
Boarding School Gadingmangu located in the Village Gadingmangu Gadingmangu, Silver District, Jombang, East Java, or about 13 kilometers from the city of Jombang. Distance from Surabaya Gadingmangu Boarding School about 93 miles or the distance of about 2 hours.

Pesanteren Gadingmangu cottage was founded in 1952 by:

1. Mr. H. Bey Prawironoto (village head at the time)
2. Mr. H.M. Mercy
3. Mr. H. Nurhadi
4. Mr. H. Nurhasan

Leadership Period:

1. Year 1952 - 1963 led by Mr. H. Bey Prawironoto
2. Year 1963 - 2006 led by Mr. KH. Abdul Syukur
3. 2006 - now led by Mr. KH. Ahmad Fathoni

== Structure Ponpes Gadingmangu ==
Pondok Pesantren Gadingmangu have an organizational structure as follows:

- Council Kyai: It is a supreme body consisting of elders boarding school authorities as the principal policy penentuk Pondok Pesantren Gadingmangu-member 6 (six) people.
- Teacher Council: Council policy is the executing agency of the Kyai in the field of educational continuity. The agency consists of the Teacher / Ustad Pondok Pesantren Gadingmangu.
- Daily Council: An executive council in charge of daily administration, management and other social activities. Daily Board members consist of representatives from Chairman, Secretary, treasurer and parts.

== Education Programs at Pondok Pesantren Gading Mangu ==
=== Religious education ===
- Quran; reading, translations, and commentaries
- Hadith Association
- Faroidh; law of distribution of inheritance
- Qiroatu sab'ah
- Nahwu shorof
- Kutubu Sitta

=== General Education ===
- Budi character / akhlakul Karimah
- Insights nationality
- Sports and Outbound
- Entrepreneurship and
- Community Service
