= Madrasa Al Husseiniya Al Kubra =

Madrasa in Tunis, Tunisia

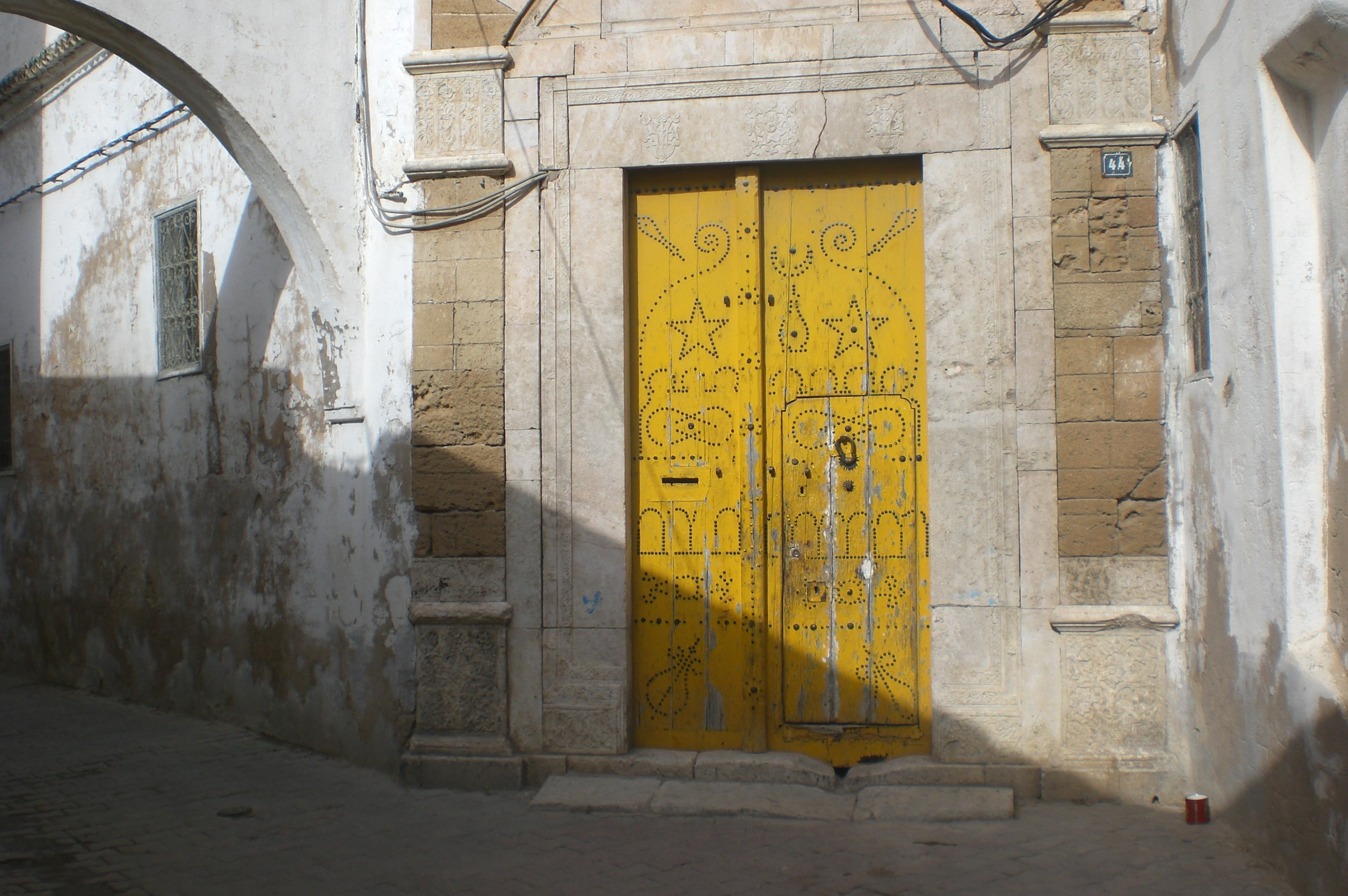
Door of the Madrasa Al Husseiniya Al Kubra

Madrasa Al Husseiniya Al Kubra (Arabic: المدرسة الحسينية الكبرى) also known as the Tourbet El Bey Madrasa, is one of the madrasahs of the medina of Tunis.

== Location ==
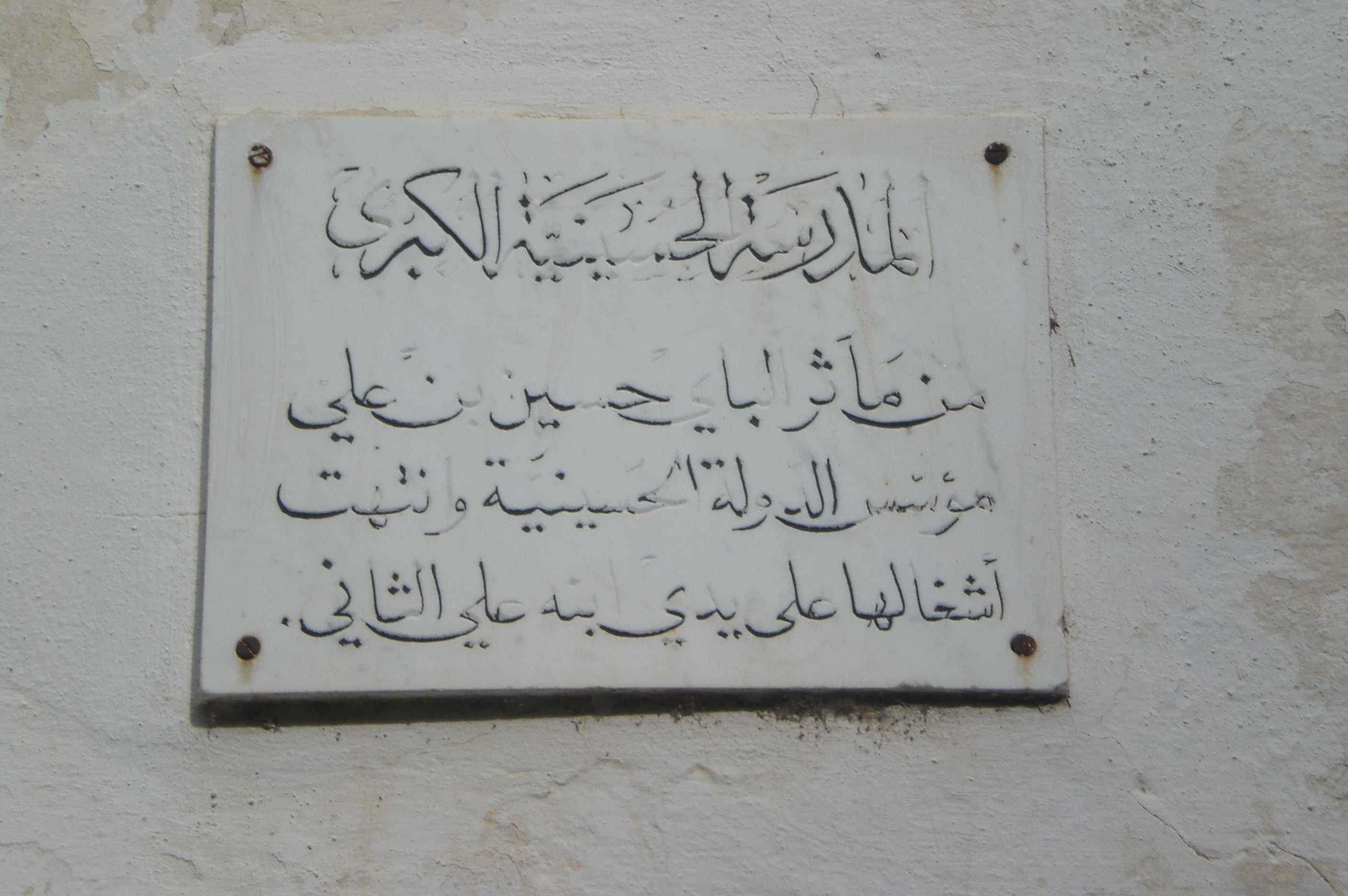
A panel with the name of the madrasa

The madrasa is located in Tourbet El Bey Street, next to Tourbet El Bey Mausoleum itself.

== History ==
It was built during the reign of Ali II ibn Hussein in 1777. It is considered one of the medina's biggest madrasas with more than 40 rooms.

== Architecture ==
The madrasa has two floors and a large hall. The 43 rooms are used to host students of Al-Zaytuna University. Also, it has a prayer room that was used for praying and teaching.
