= Kütahya Archaeology Museum =

Museum in Kütahya, Turkey

- Kütahya Arkeoloji Müzesi
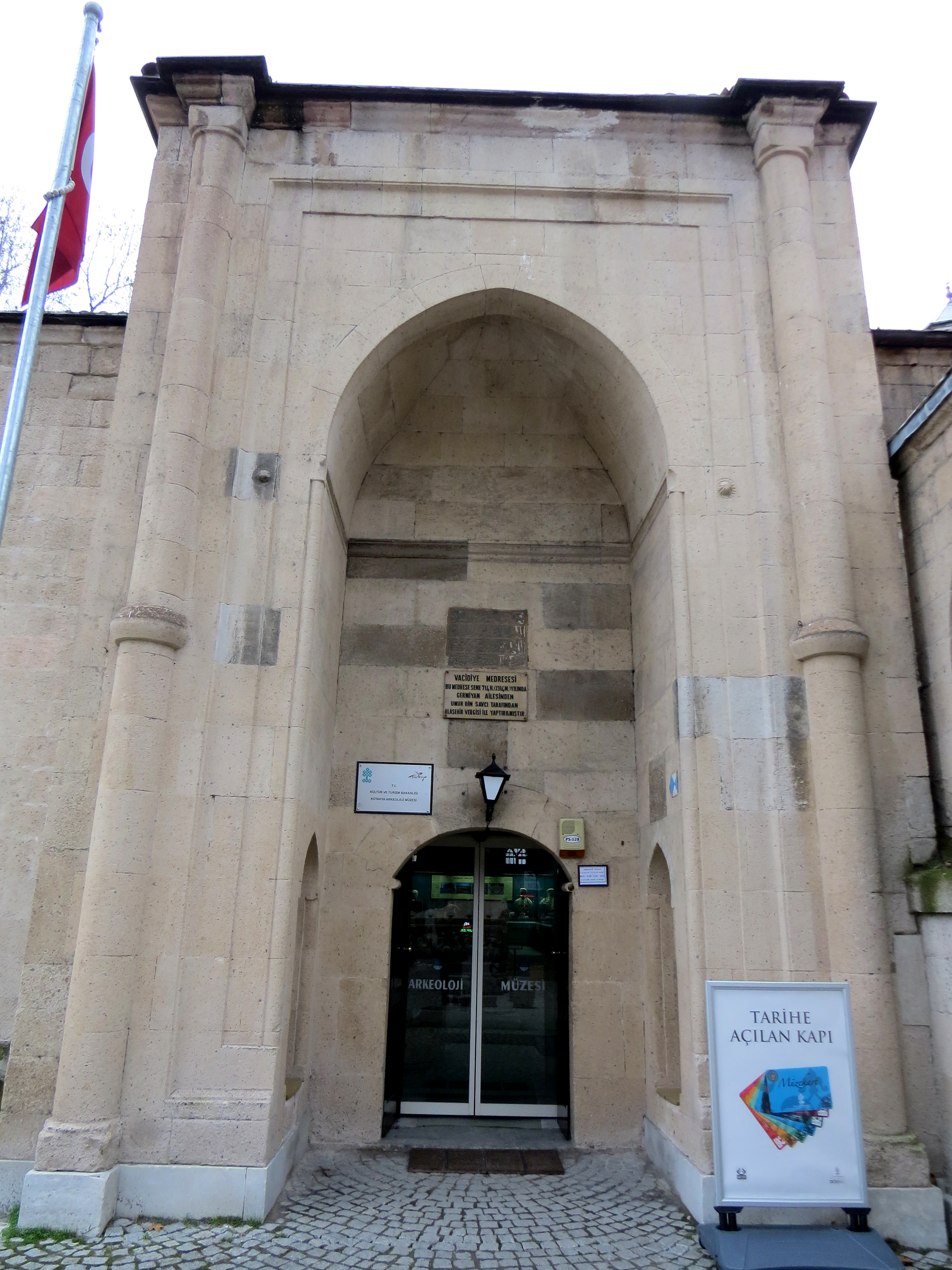
- The portal of the museum

- Kütahya Museum
- Established: 1965; 61 years ago
- Coordinates: 39°25′02″N 29°58′34″E
- Type: Archaeology
- Collections: Paleolithic, Chalcolithic, Bronze Age, Hittite, Phrygia, Hellenistic, Roman Empire, Byzantine Empire, Seljuk Empire, Ottoman Empire
- Owner: Ministry of Culture and Tourism

Kütahya Archaeological Museum is a museum in Kütahya, Turkey.

The museum is located in the Vacidiye Medrese, a historical medrese (Islamic school) building commissioned by the Germinyanid ruler Umur in 1314. It is next to Kütahya Ulu Mosque ("Grand mosque") at 39°25′02″N 29°58′34″E. In 1965 it was opened as a museum. After a period of restoration it was reopened on 5 March 1999.

The building material is cut stone and the portal is of Seljukid style. There are nine rooms. The exhibits span the Paleolithic, Chalcolithic, Bronze Age, Hittite, Phrygian, Hellenistic, Roman, Byzantine, Seljukid and Ottoman eras. The oldest items are painted ceramics from Hacılar.

One interesting item is a sarcophagus of a supposed Amazon, a rare specimen.
