= Indonesia Institute of Islamic Dawah =

Islamic organization based in Jakarta, Indonesia

- Lembaga Dakwah Islam Indonesia
- Area served
- Abbreviation: LDII
- Established: January 3, 1972; 54 years ago
- Founder: Drs. Nur Hasyim, et al.
- Founded at: Kediri
- Type: NGO
- Tax ID no.: 02.414.788.6-036.000
- Registration no.: AHU-18.AH.01.06.Tahun.2008
- Legal status: foundation
- Purpose: humanitarian, socio-religious activism
- Headquarters: Jalan Arteri Tentara Pelajar 28, Patal, Senayan, Jakarta Selatan 12210
- Location: Indonesia
- Coordinates: 6.219356°S 106.792042°E
- Region served: Indonesia
- Methods: Islamic proselytism
- Members: 30+ millions
- Official languages: Indonesian and English
- Head of the Advisory Council: Kasmudi Asshidqi, S.E., M.Ak.
- Chairman: Ir. Chriswanto Santoso, M.Sc.
- General Secretary: Dody Taufiq Wijaya, Ak., M.Com., CA.
- Website: ldii.or.id
- Formerly called: Yayasan Karyawan Islam (YAKARI); Lembaga Karyawan Islam (LEMKARI)

Indonesia Institute of Islamic Dawah (Indonesian: Lembaga Dakwah Islam Indonesia, LDII) is one of the Islamic community organizations in Indonesia that focuses on preaching and teaching Islam based on the Qur'an and Hadith. This organization is known to have rapid development, with an estimated number of non-members who participate in activities or are influenced by its preaching reaching more than 30 million people. However, LDII also faced a number of controversies that accompanied its organizational journey.

== History ==
LDII was founded on July 1, 1972, in Kediri City, East Java, with the initial name of the Islamic Employee Institution Foundation (YAKARI). The establishment of this organization was based on the Notarial Deed of Mudijomo dated July 27, 1972, which was a correction of the Deed dated January 3, 1972 regarding the determination of the date of establishment of LEMKARI. This institution was founded by several figures, namely:

1. Drs. Nur Hasyim;
2. Drs. Edi Masyadi;
3. Drs. Bahroni Hertanto;
4. Soetojo Wirjo Atmodjo, BA;
5. Wijono, BA.

In 1981, through the YAKARI Grand Conference, the name of the organization was changed to the Islamic Employee Institution (LEMKARI). Furthermore, at the Fourth LEMKARI Grand Conference in 1990, the name of the organization was changed again to the Indonesia Institute of Islamic Dawah (LDII). This change was made at the direction of the Vice President of the Republic of Indonesia at that time, Sudharmono, and Rudini. The name "LEMKARI" was changed because it was considered similar to the abbreviation of the Indonesian Karate-Do Institute.

== Legal status and motto ==
=== Legal status ===
LDII is an independent and legal organization in accordance with the regulations below:

1. Undang-undang Nomor 16 tahun 2017 tentang Organisasi Kemasyarakatan;
2. Surat Keterangan terdaftar No. 98/D.III.3/VIII/2005 tanggal 23 Agustus 2005 dari Kesbangpol Kemendagri RI;
3. Keputusan Menteri Hukum dan Hak Asasi Manusia RI No. AHU-18.AH.01.06.Tahun.2008 tertanggal 20 Februari 2008;
4. Keputusan Komisi Fatwa Majelis Ulama Indonesia No. 03/Kep/KF-MUI/IX/2006 Tanggal 11 Syaban 1427 H / 4 September 2006 tentang Lembaga Dakwah Islam Indonesia (LDII);
5. AD/ART LDII.

== Structure and figures ==
=== Structure ===
LDII adopted an organizational level similar to Golongan Karya, this is inseparable from the closeness of the two in the past. The details are as follows:

Number	Name	Status	Position at Level	Number
1	DPP	Central Leadership Council	Capital	1
2	DPW	Regional Leadership Council	Province	38
3	DPD	Regional Leadership Council	Regency/City	514
4	PC	Branch Leader	District/Sub-district	7,094
5	PAC	Sub-Branch Leader	Village/Sub-district	83,447

=== Famous people ===
LDII members who are well known to the public include:

- Benyamin Sueb, Indonesian actor, comedian, director and singer.
- Ben Kasyafani, Indonesian actor and presenter.
- Ida Royani, Indonesian model, actor, singer, fashion designer and politician.
- Didi Petet, Indonesian actor and producer.
- Keenan Nasution, Indonesian musician and singer.
- Suryo Agung Wibowo, Indonesian football player and runner.
- Dikri Yusron, Indonesian footballer
- Budi Sudarsono, Indonesian footballer and coach.
- Herry Kiswanto, Indonesian footballer and coach.
- Ki Joko Bodo, former Indonesian actor.

== See also ==
- Islam in Indonesia
- Indonesian Ulema Council
- Nahdlatul Ulama
- Muhammadiyah
- Hizbut Tahrir Indonesia
