= Zahiriyya Madrasa =

Madrasa in Aleppo, Syria

Coordinates: 36°11′16″N 37°9′28″E

- الْمَدْرَسَة الظَّاهِرِيَّة
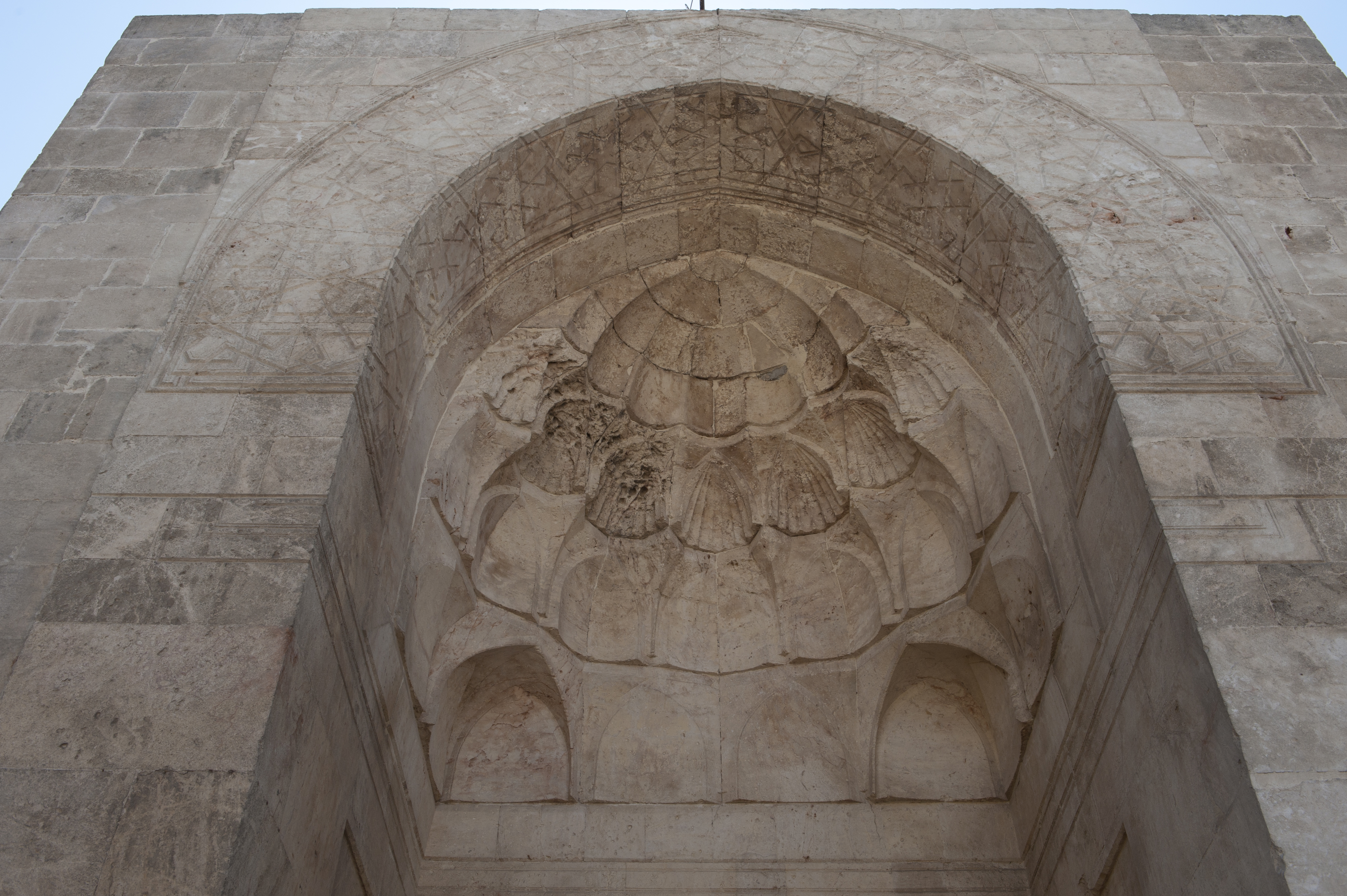
- Entrance of the Madrasa

Location
- Bab al-Maqam district Aleppo; Syria

Information
- Type: madrasa
- Established: 1217
- Campus: Urban
- Affiliation: Islamic

The Zahiriyya Madrasa (Arabic: الْمَدْرَسَة الظَّاهِرِيَّة, romanized: al-Madrasa ẓ-Ẓāhiriyya) is a 13th-century madrasa complex in Aleppo, Syria. It is attributed to the Ayyubid emir of Aleppo Al-Zahir Ghazi.

== See also ==
- Al-Firdaws Madrasa
- Sultaniyya Madrasa
- Uthmaniyya Madrasa
- Ancient City of Aleppo
- Khusruwiyah Mosque
- High medieval domes
