= Madrasa Ennakhla =

Former madrasa in Tunis, Tunisia

Coordinates: 36.7971°N 10.1718°E

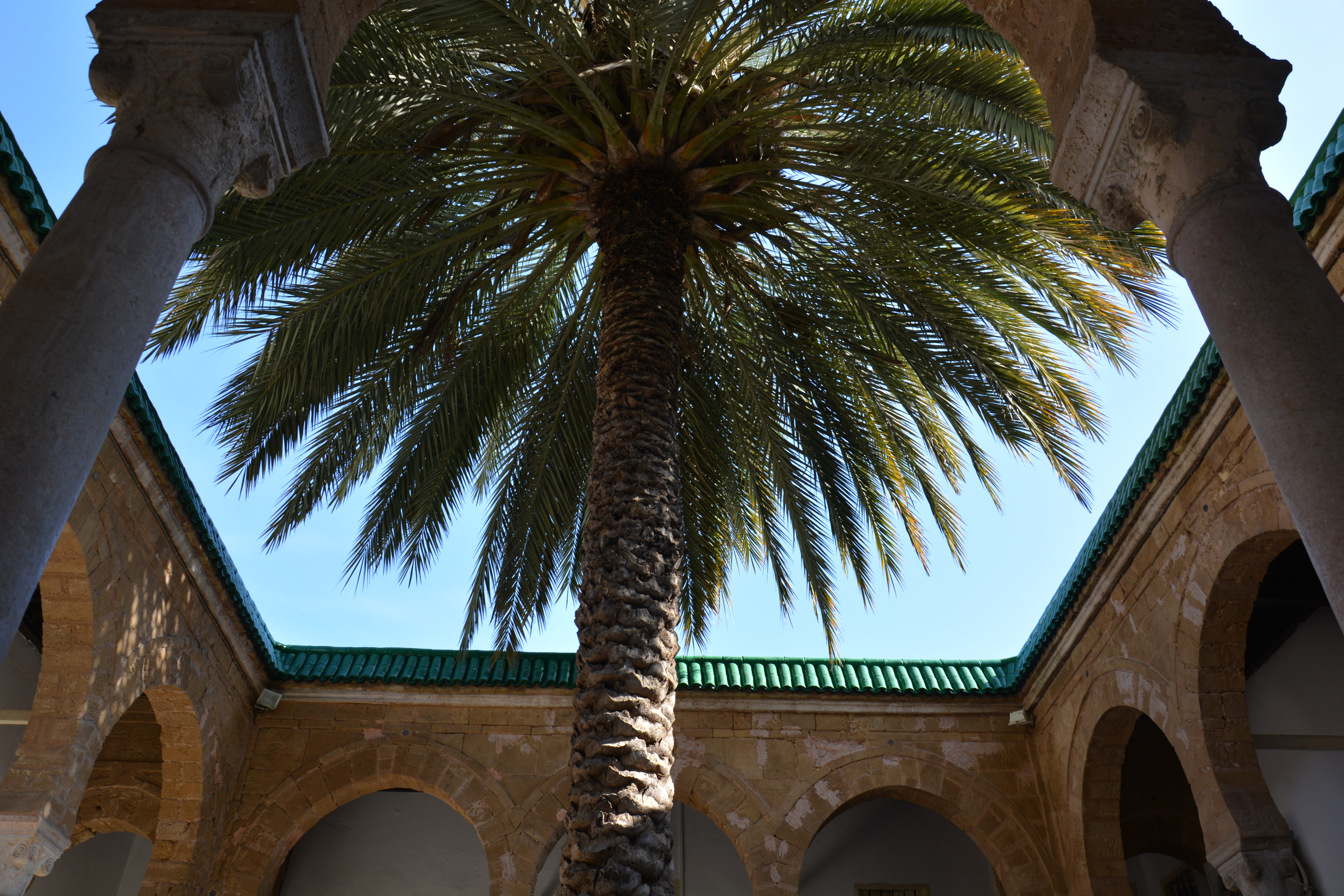
Palm tree at the center of the madrasa's patio after which it is named.

Madrasa Ennakhla or Madrasa of the Palm (Arabic: المدرسة السليمانية) is a former madrasa and one of the monuments of the Ottoman era in the medina of Tunis. It is named after the palm tree at the center of its patio which still stands today.

== Location ==
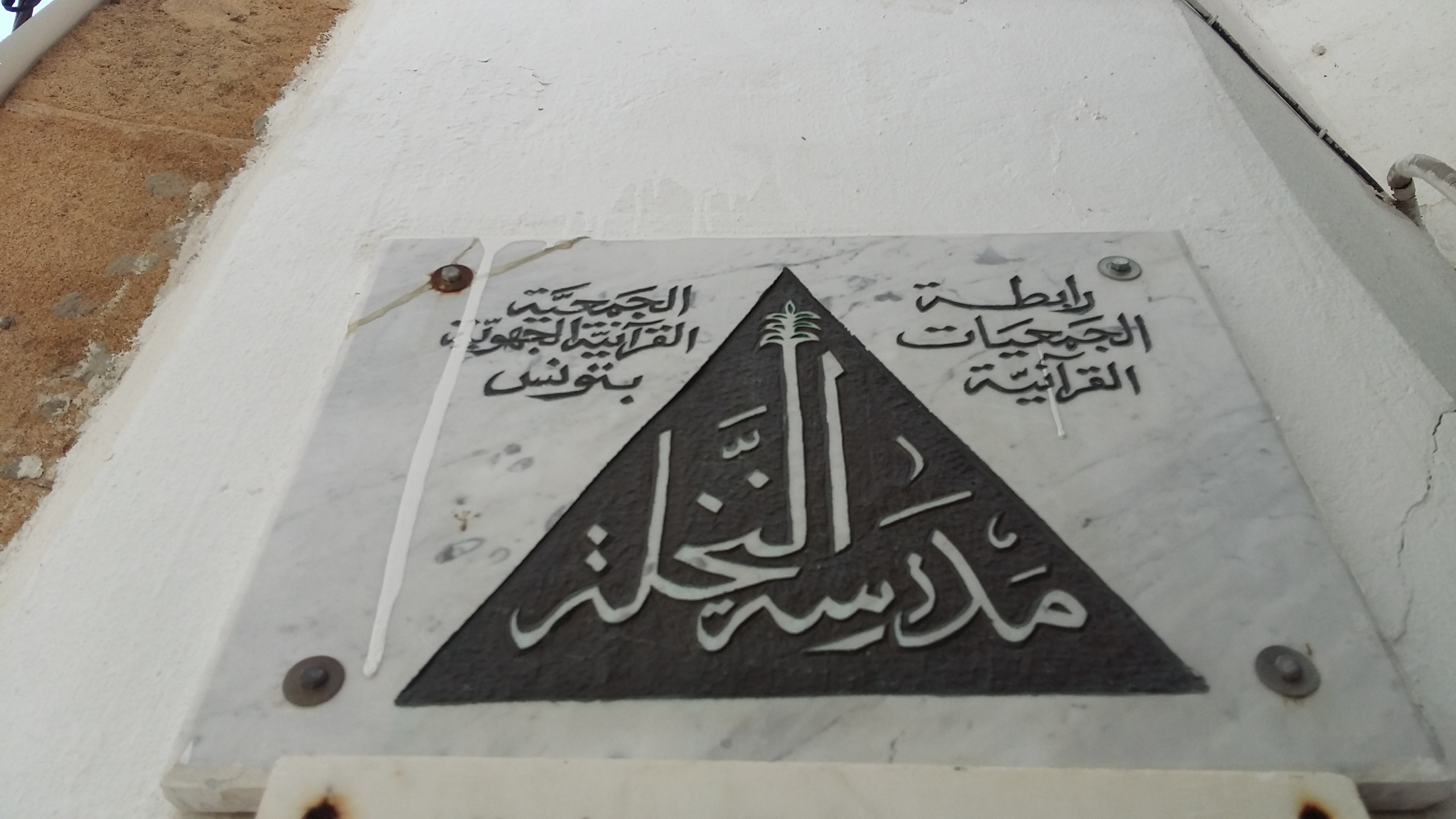
Marble plaque indicating the madrasa's name.

The madrasa is located near the Al-Zaytuna Mosque, at the Souk El Koutbiya, and was built on the site of a caravanserai that used to sell wine. The madrasa is also close to Madrasa Slimania and Madrasa El Bachia. Those three madrasas nearing the Al-Zaytuna Mosque provided schooling and housing for the University of Ez-Zitouna students.

== History ==
Madrasa Ennakhla is the second madrasa founded by Al-Husayn I ibn Ali and was constructed in 1714. It is of great archaeological and historical interest as its simple architecture is representative of traditional buildings used for student housing. It was the first among the three madrasas to be built and the closest to the Al-Zaytuna Mosque. Since its restoration in 1979 by the National institute of Arts and Architecture, it is in a good state.

== Description ==
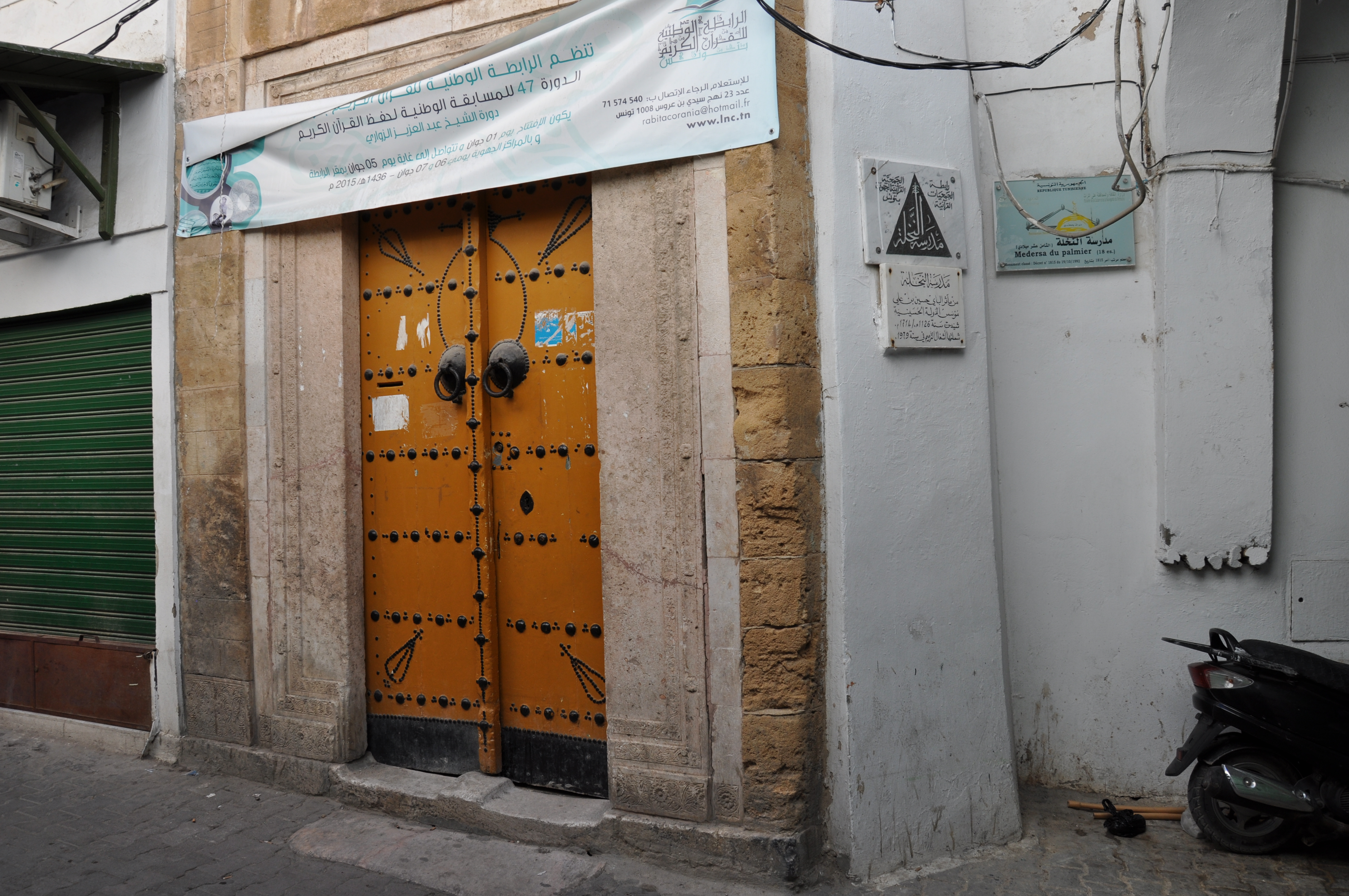
Door of the madrasa.

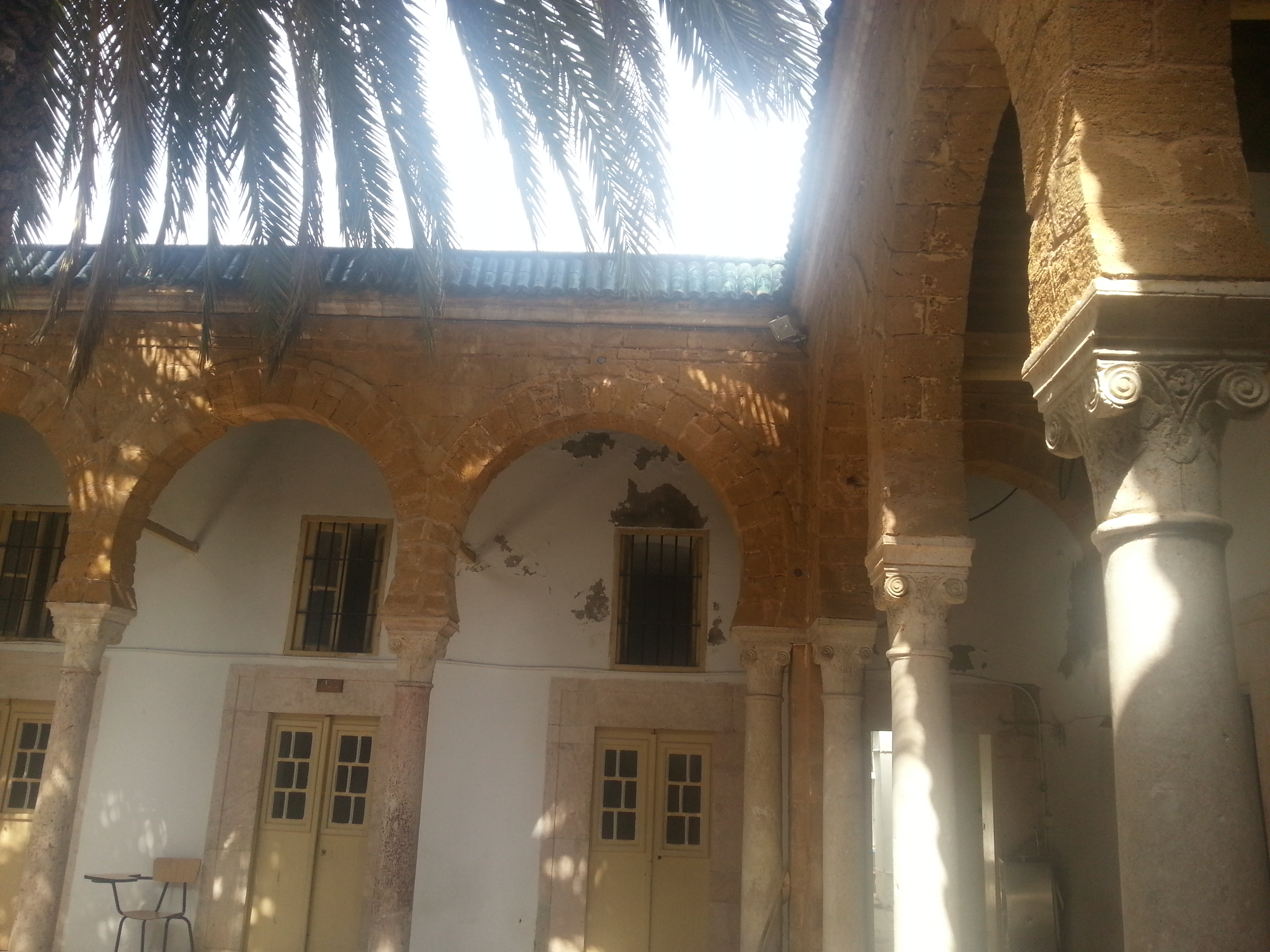
Doors of the rooms around the patio.

The madrasa is composed of a main entrance, a patio, twelve rooms and a prayer hall (masjid).

The entrance consists of a wooden double door. The internal frame is made of limestone (kaddal) and the second frame is made of hirsh. The entrance also includes two skifas; the first is rectangular with flat wooden ceiling joists; the access to the second skifa is made by a door in the left wall of the first skifa. The second skifa is smaller in size and is covered by a vault.

The patio has high arches on stone columns with Turkish capitals on all four sides of an almost square courtyard. The porticos are covered with El Haouaria stones. Each portico has three arches carved from the same stone. A glazed tile cornice surrounds the upper walls of the patio.

Twelve rooms of different dimensions surround the patio on three sides. Their doors are framed with kaddal. Small windows over the doors are used for ventilation and lighting.

The founder of Madrasa Ennakhla, Al-Husayn I ibn Ali, decorated the prayer hall's walls with richly carved plaster as well as its mihrab. Its facade is the largest on the patio. At its center is the main door of the prayer hall, which is rectangular in shape and covered with arches. The upper part of the walls is decorated with gypsum carving making an eight-pointed star on either side of a pine tree. The center of the room's back wall has a hollow mihrab, with a covered half dome of carved stucco decoration.

== Sources ==
- Association de sauvegarde de la médina de Tunis document
