= Souk El Koutbiya =

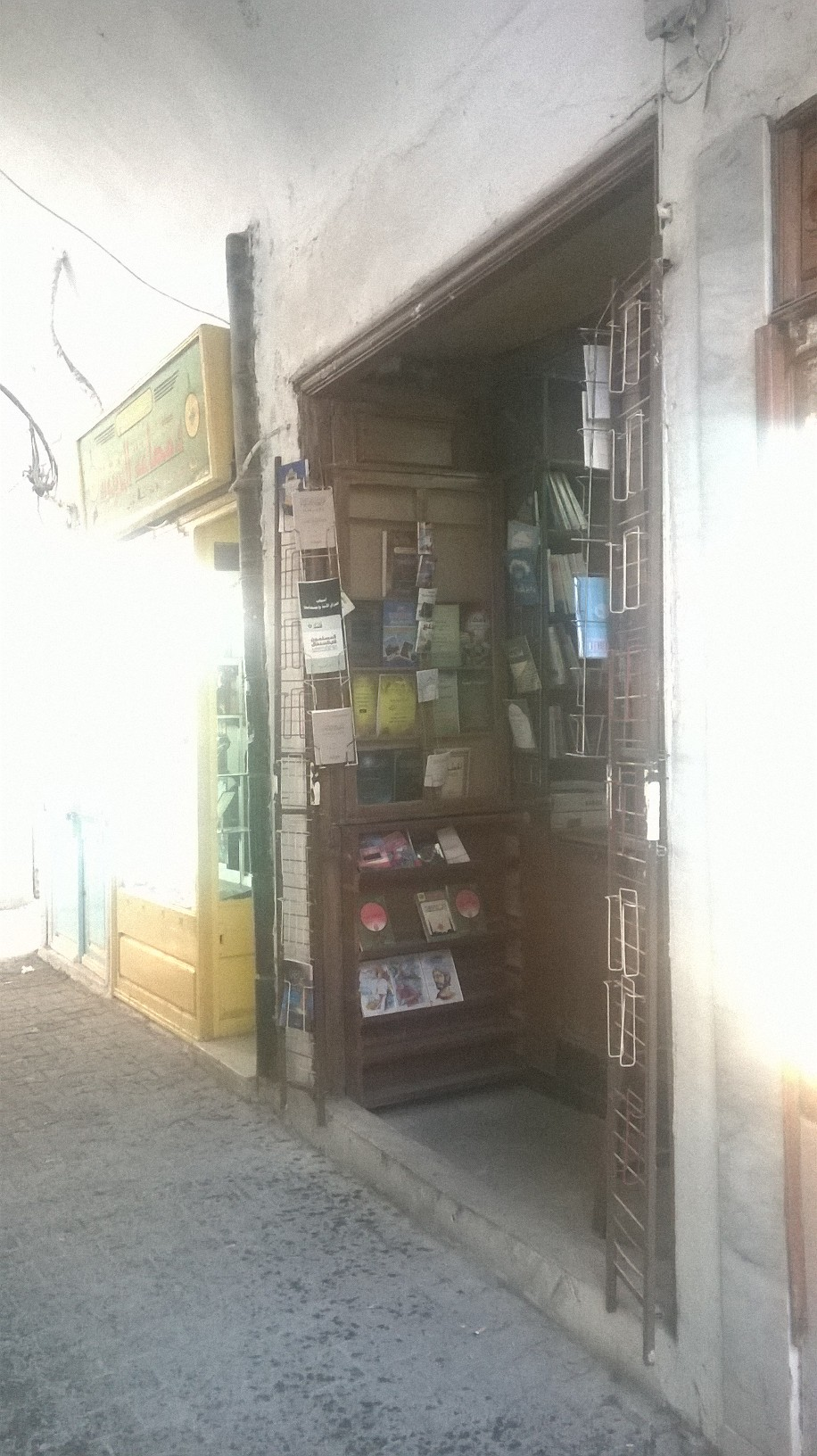
View of the souk

Souk El Koutbiya (Arabic: سوق الكتبية) is one of the souks in the medina of Tunis. It is specialized in the selling of books.

== Location ==
This souk is located in the proximity of the Al-Zaytuna Mosque, near Souk El Fekka.

It is delimited by Souk El Kachachine.

== History ==
Souk El Koutbiya was established by Abu l-Hasan Ali I between 1750 and 1755.

At the same time, Madrasa Slimania and Madrasa El Bachia were built.
