= Madrasa Slimania =

Madrasa in Tunis, Tunisia

Coordinates: 36.7967°N 10.1719°E

Madrasa Slimania (Arabic: المدرسة السليمانية) is a former madrasa and one of the monuments of the Ottoman era in the medina of Tunis.

== History ==
It was built in 1754 by Abu l-Hasan Ali I in memory of his son Suleiman (who was poisoned by his brother), near the Al-Zaytuna Mosque and Souk El Kachachine. It was the first one of four madrasahs to be built by Abu l-Hasan Ali I : Madrasa El Bachia, Madrasa El Achouria and Madrasa Bir Lahjar.

== Architecture ==
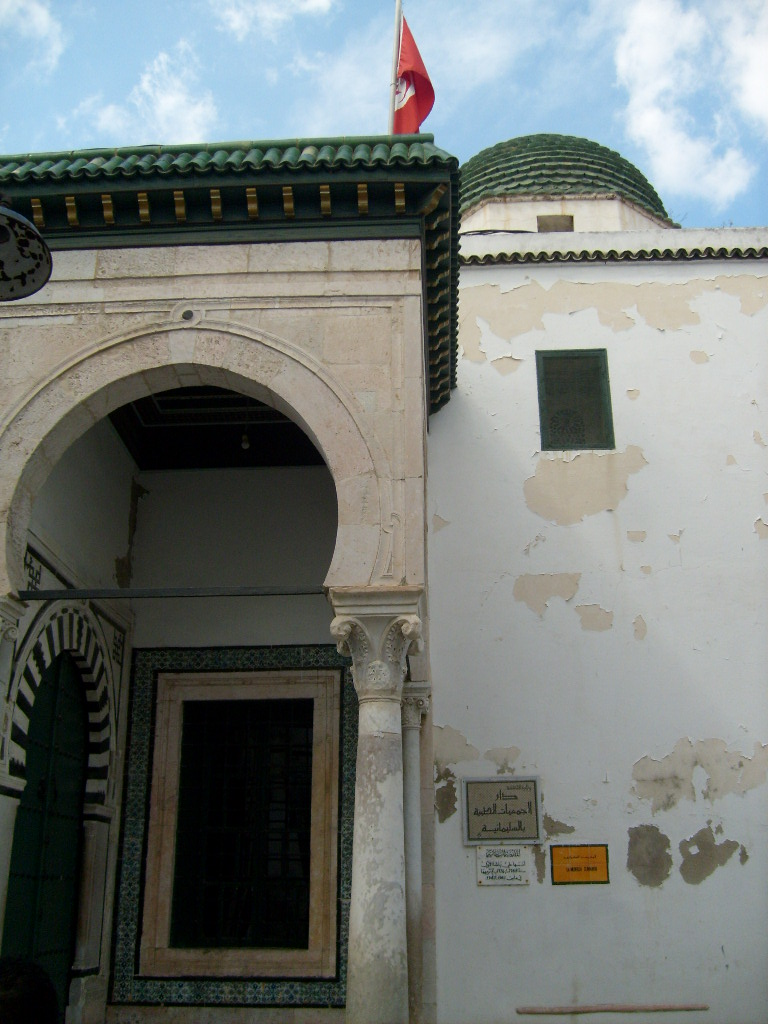
Porch of Madrasa Slimania

Madrasa Slimania is known for its porch located at a higher level compared to the street. This porch offers access to a richly decorated entrance with an Ottoman touch. Columns and capitals hold its beautiful stone arch (kadhel et harch) with its green roof tiles cornice.

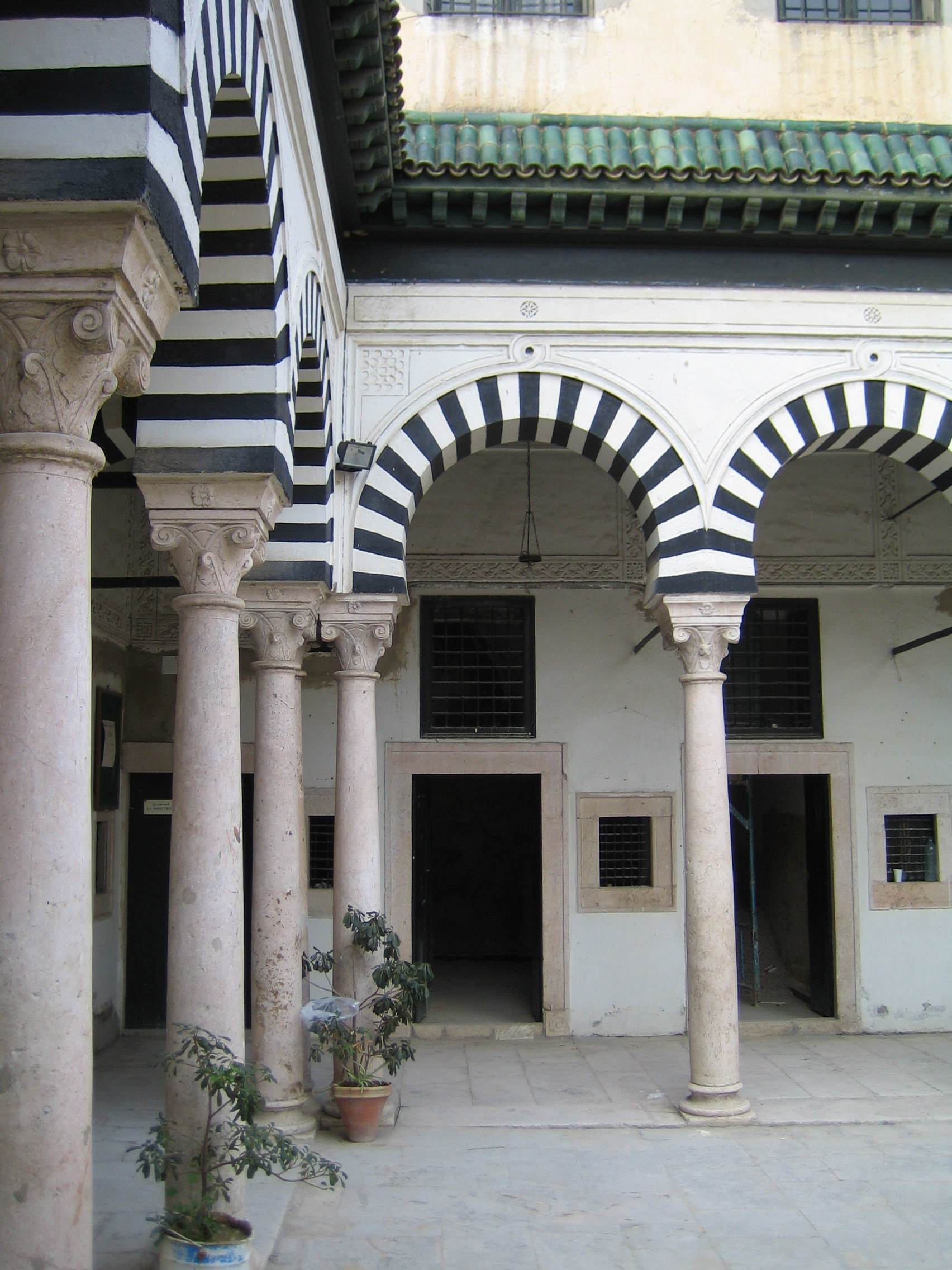
Arches and columns of the courtyard

The courtyard is surrounded by four galleries: one of them gives access to a prayer room and the three others to 18 rooms formerly hosting students. The prayer room is divided into three naves of three bays and has a colourful marble mihrab. It has an octagonal dome covered with green tiles. The walls of this room are covered by locally made faience panels deploying the Basmala and the 99 Names of Allah.

Madrasa Slimania was restored in 1982 by the National Heritage Institute and the Association de sauvegarde de la médina de Tunis. Nowadays, it is the head office of many medical associations.

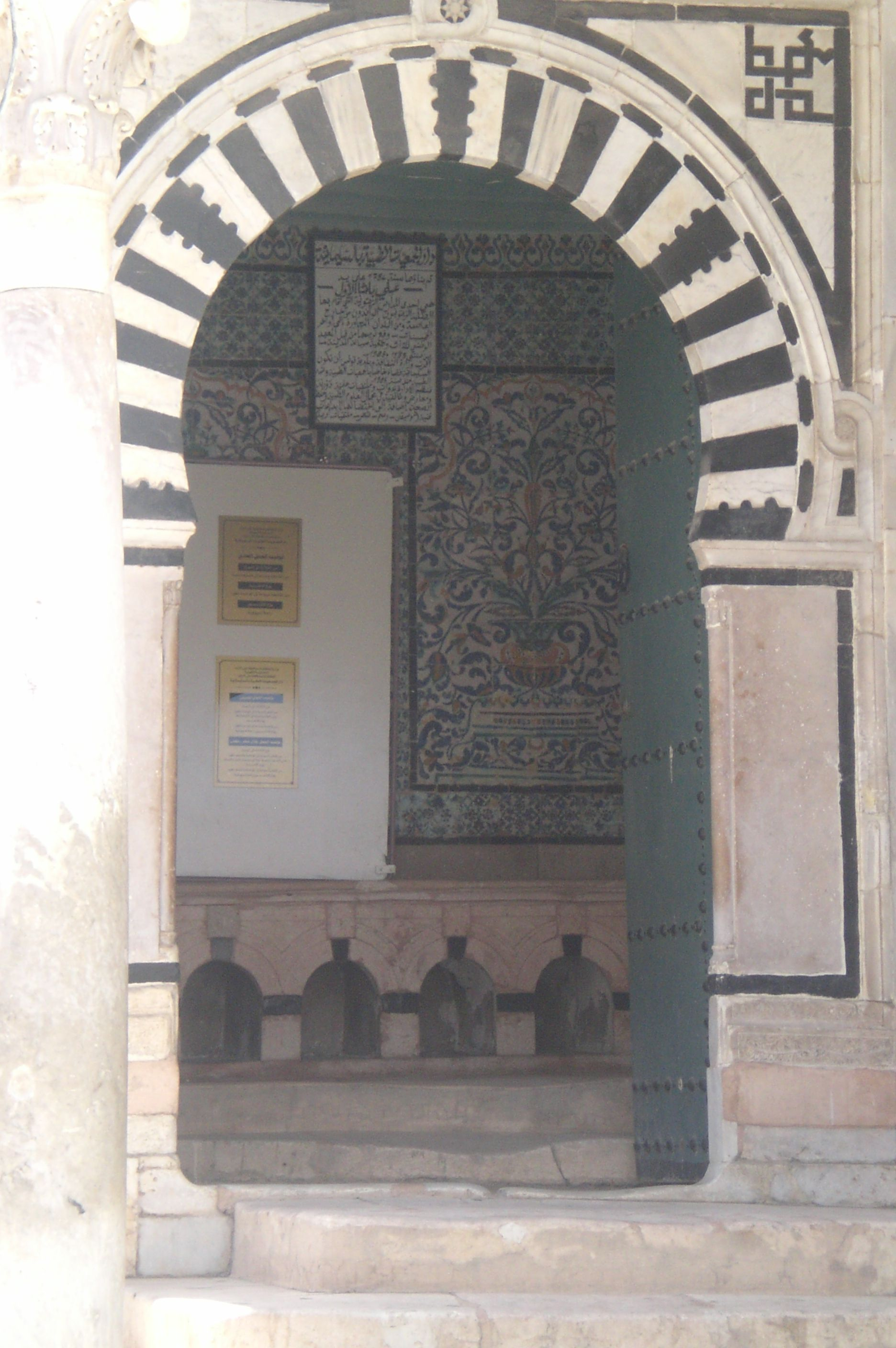
Entrance door

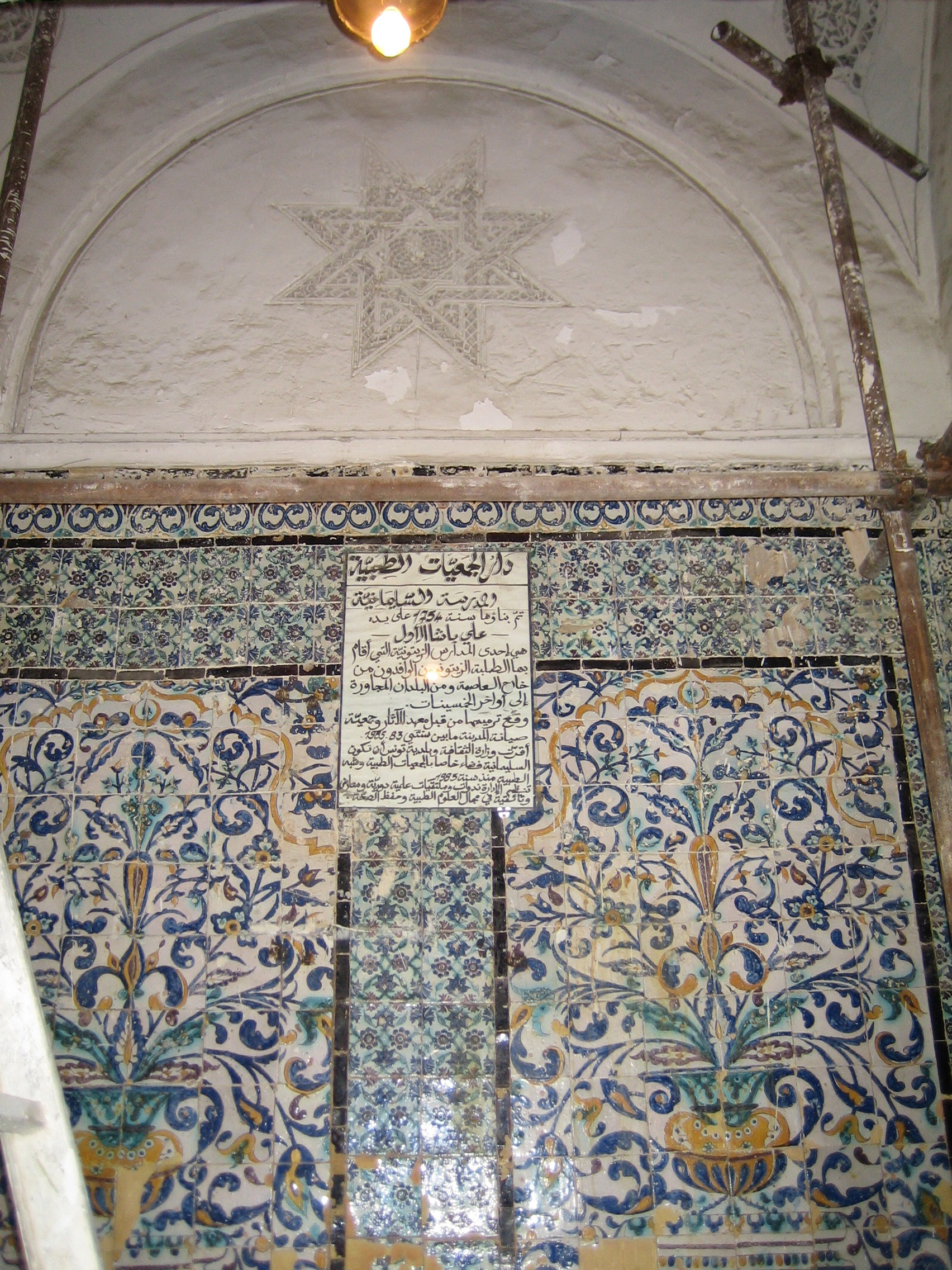
Faience panels on vestibule walls

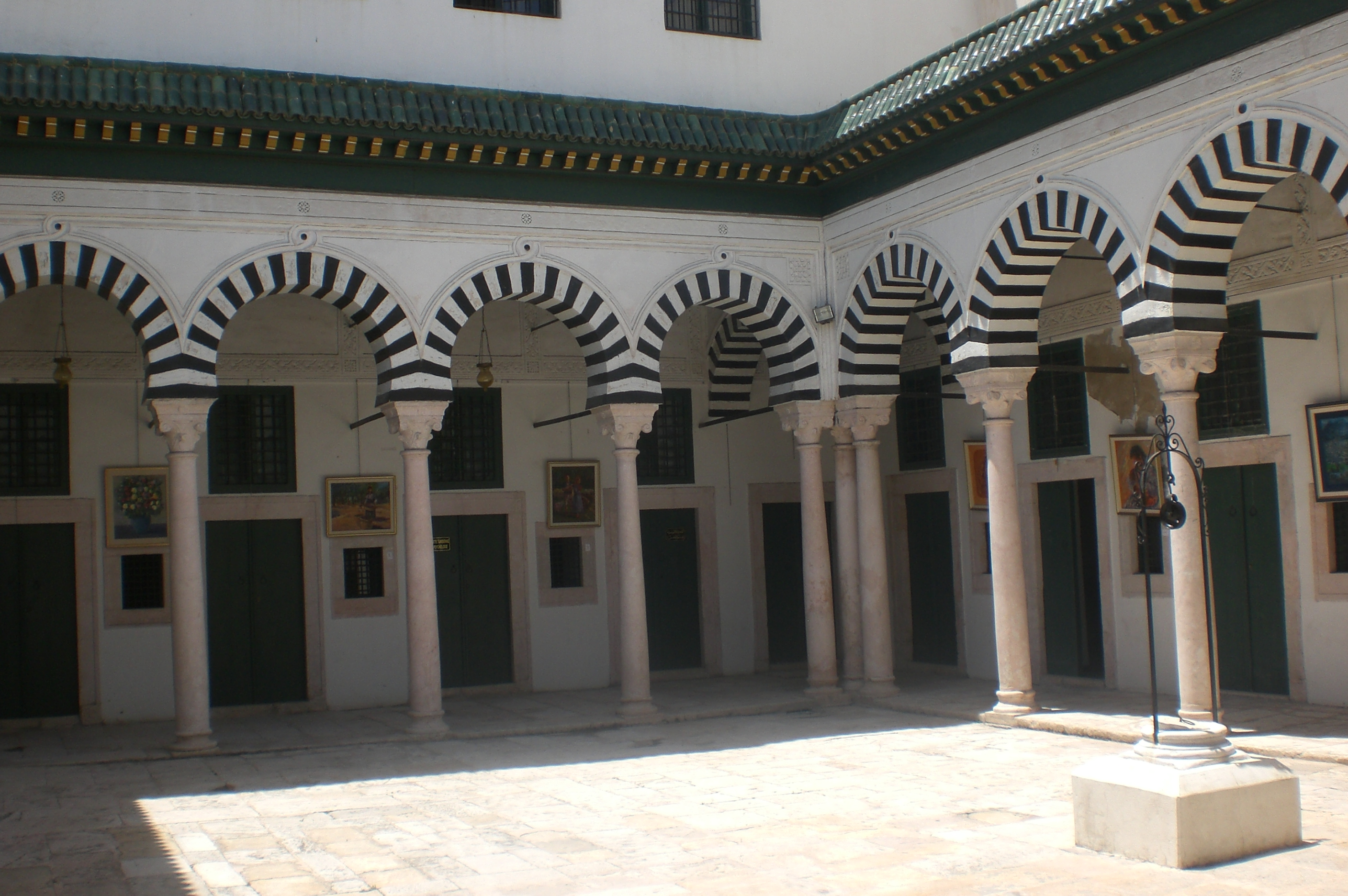
Courtyard
