= Sebai =

Sebai is a surname. Notable people with the surname include:

- Senin Sebai (born 1993), Ivorian footballer
- Leïla Ladjimi-Sebaï, Tunisian historian
- Naser Al Sebai (born 1985), Syrian footballer
- Nahed El Sebai (born 1987), Egyptian actress
