= Madrasa Bir Lahjar =

Madrasa in Tunis, Tunisia

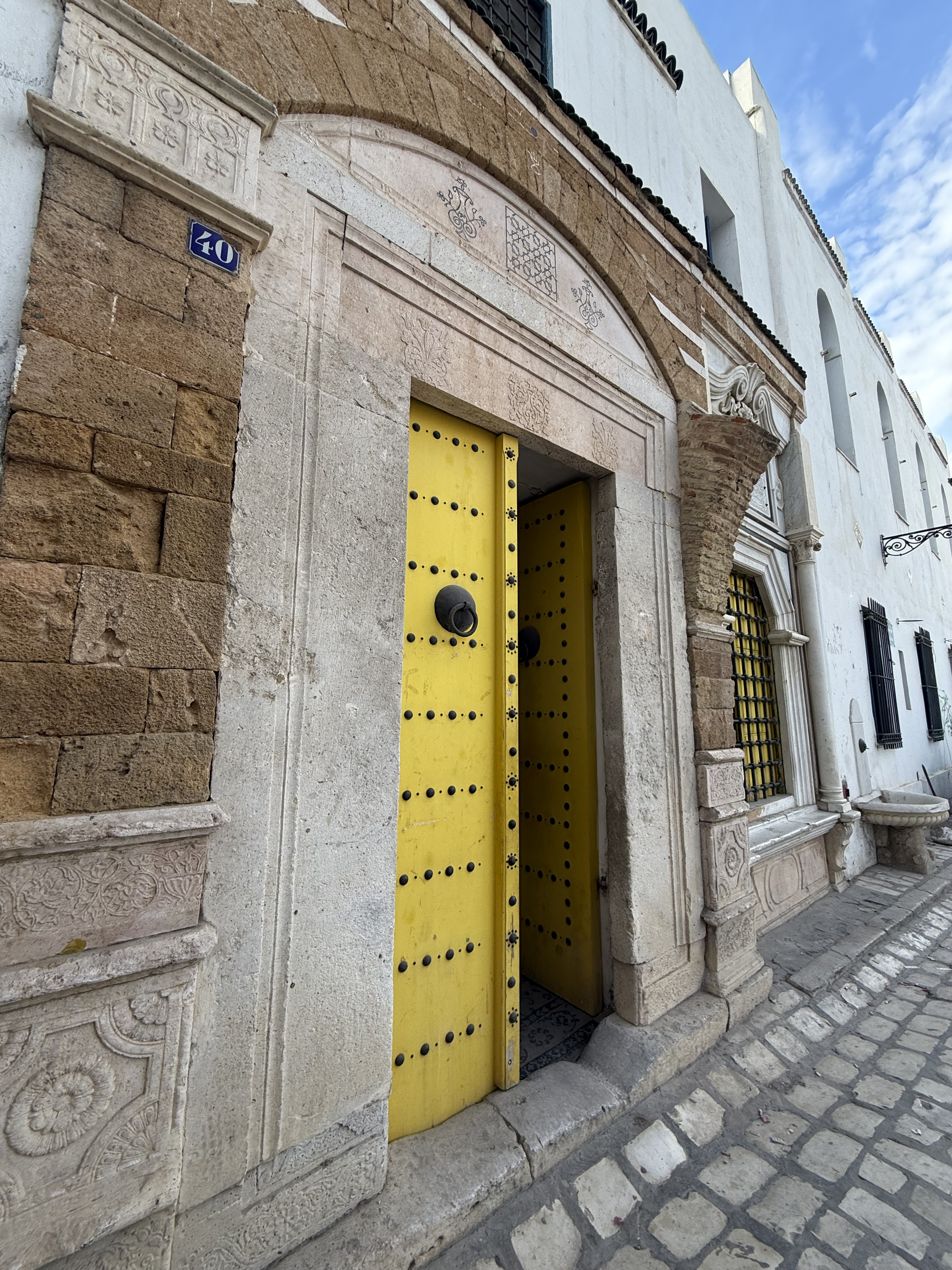
Entrance of madrasa Bir Lahjar

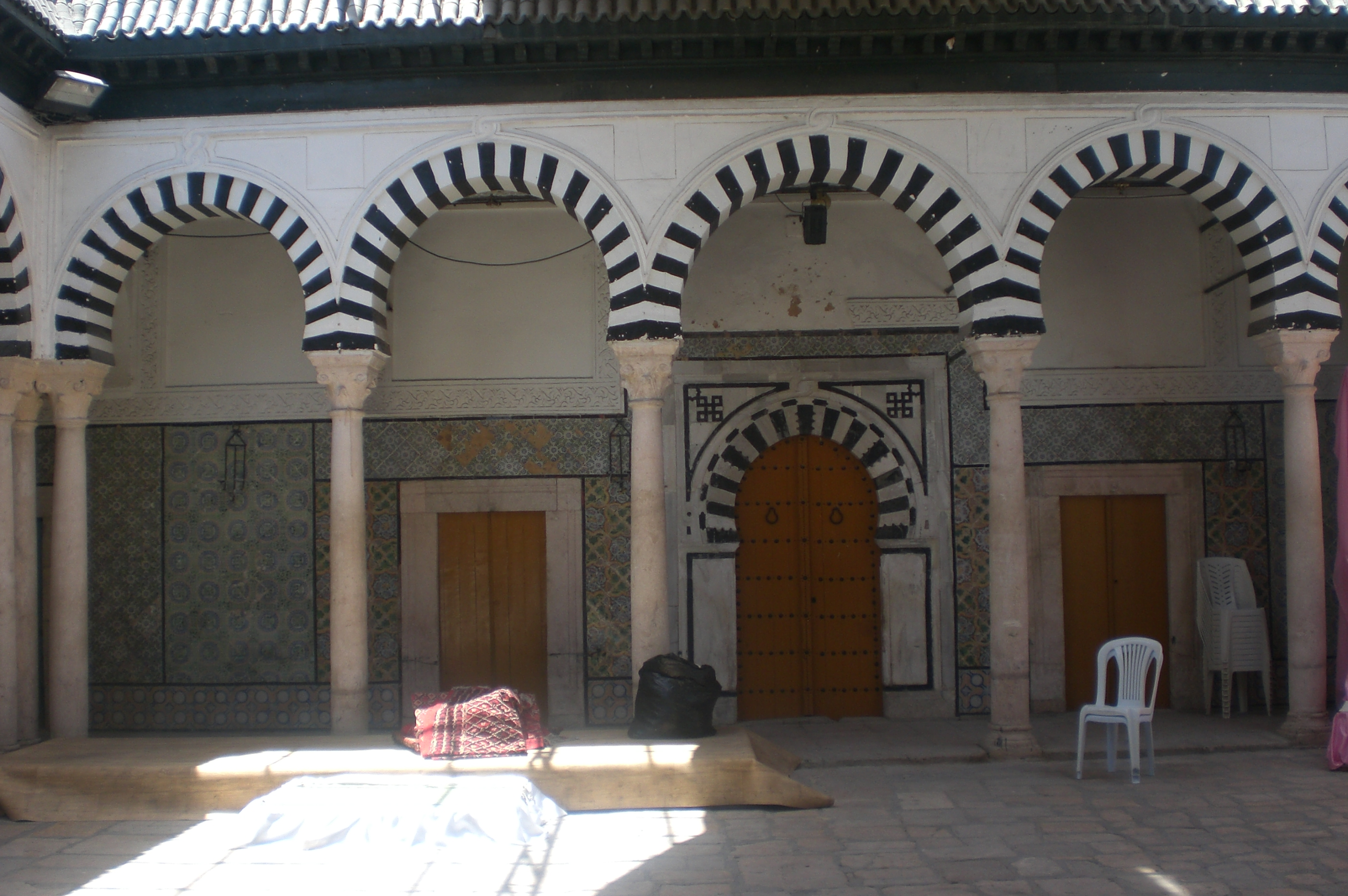
Hall of the madrasa

Madrasa Bir Lahjar (Arabic: مدرسة بئر الأحجار) is one of the madrasahs of the Medina of Tunis.

== Location ==
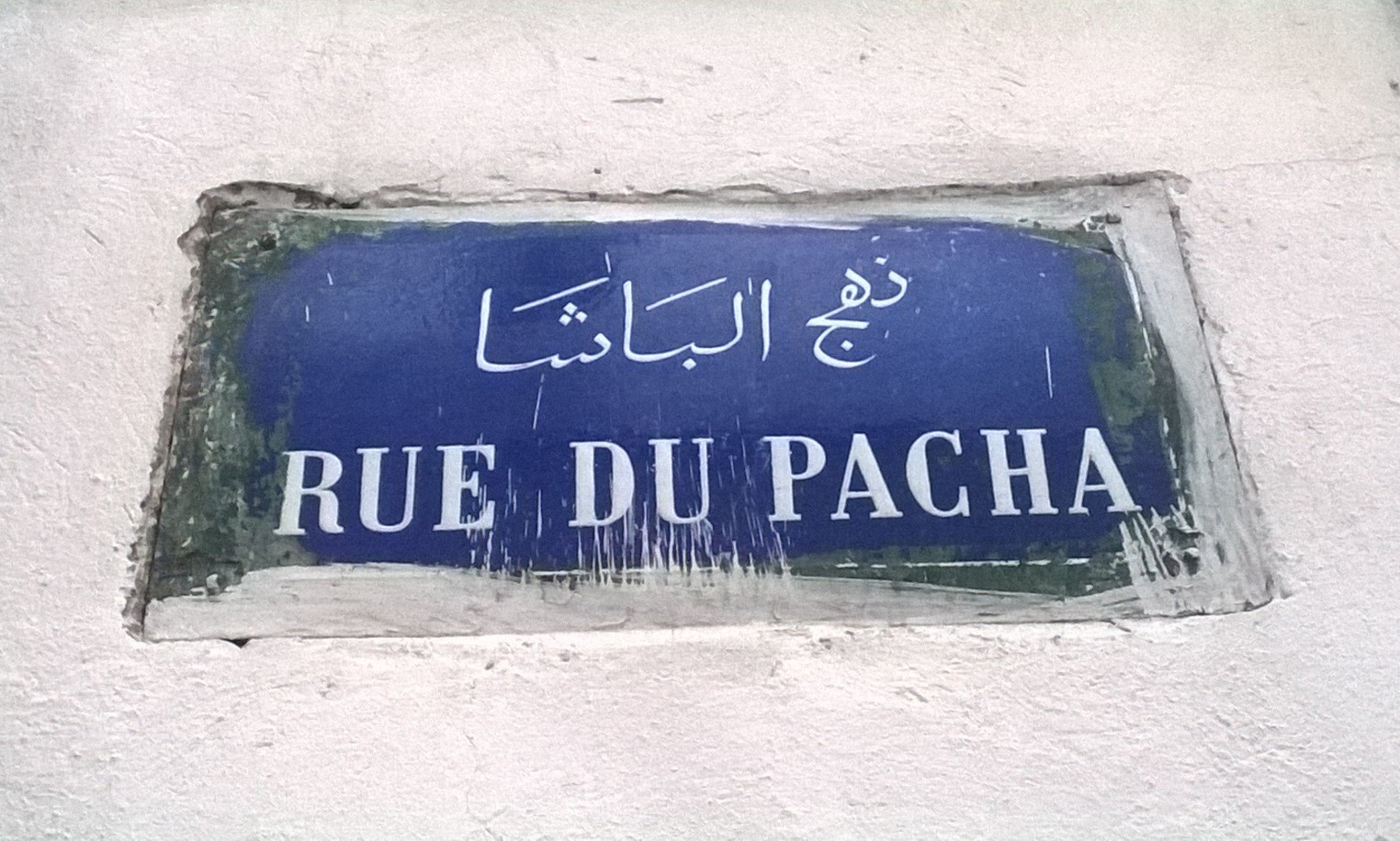
Metallic plaque of El Pacha Street

It is located at 40 El Pacha Street.

== History ==
Abu l-Hasan Ali I the Husainid Bey built four madrasas during his reign including the madrasa El Bachia in 1752 and the madrasa El Achouria in 1756. In the same year, he commanded that the Madrasa Bir Lahjar should be built.

The construction works finished a year later in 1757 after the death of the bey.

The madrasa hosted for decades Malikite students coming from different regions in the country.

== Habous ==
Thanks to Abu l-Hasan Ali I, the madrasa had 25 different financial resources or Habous like 5 Foundouks, 3 shops, 1 house, etc.

== Architecture ==
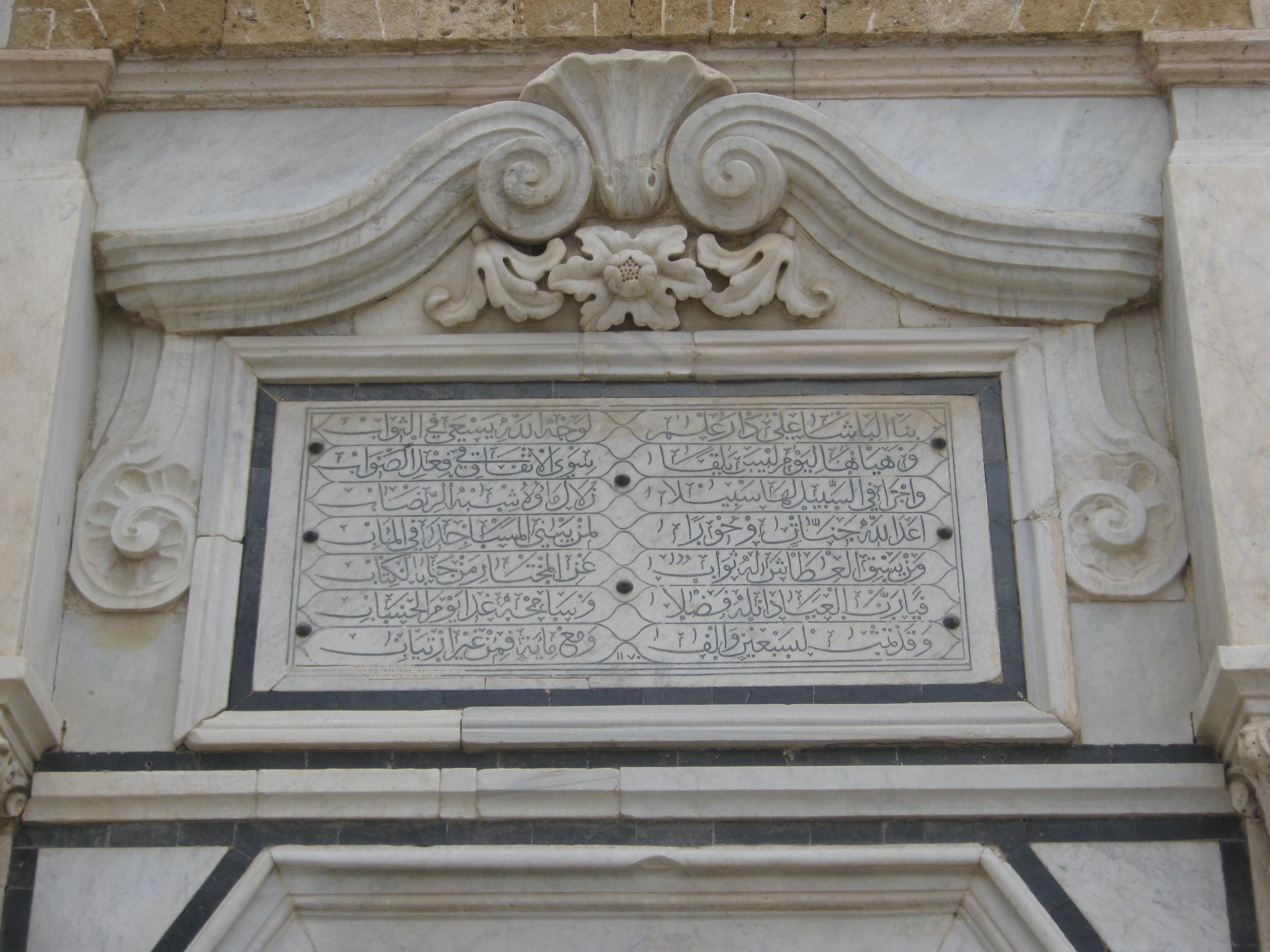
Foundation text of the madrasa

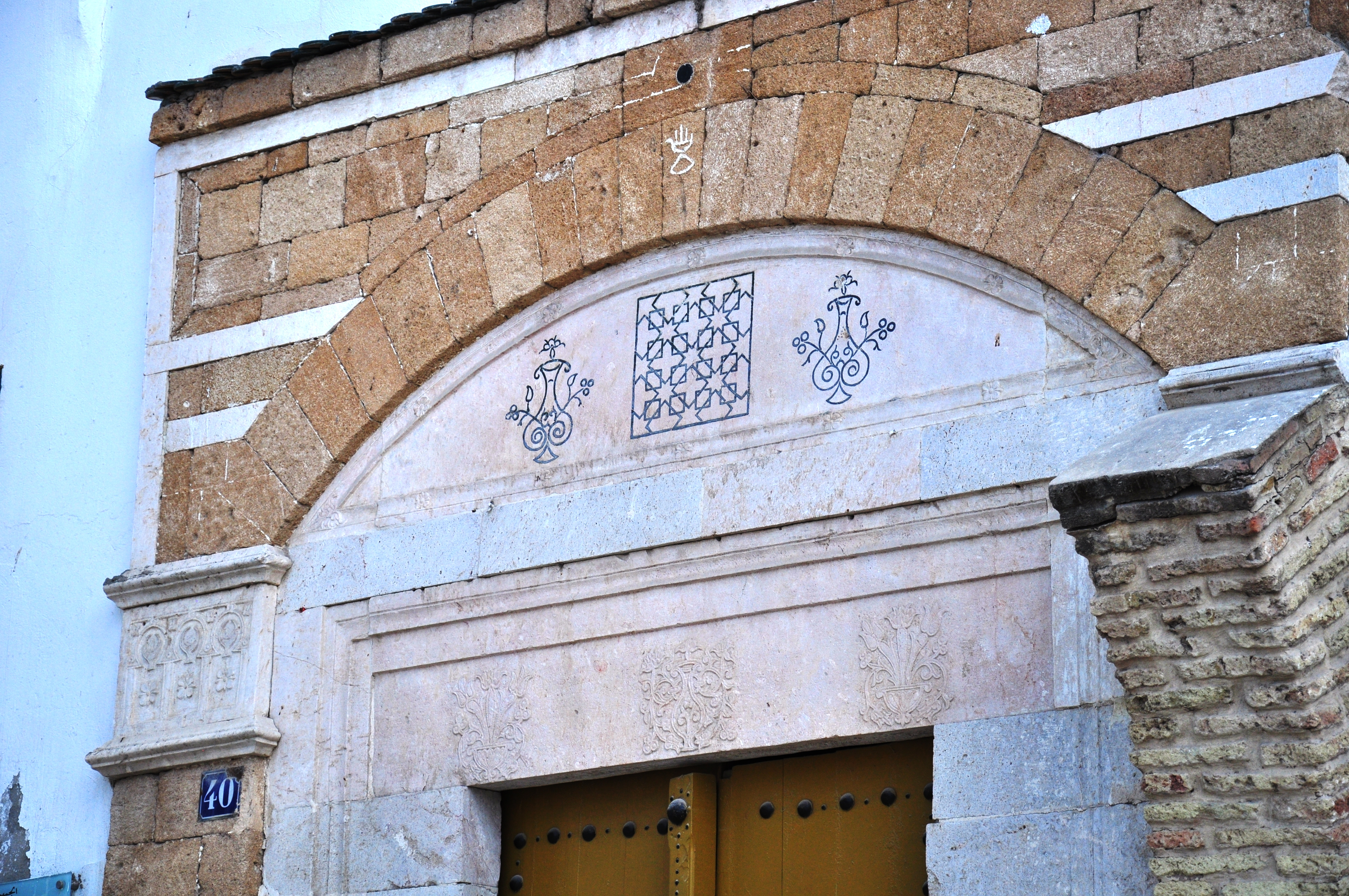
Decoration element

The entrance has a beautiful marble plating.

On the right of the door, the madrasa has a sabil decorated with a window and a marble plaque in which some information about the madrasa's foundation is inscribed.

It has 16 rooms for the students and a prayer room.

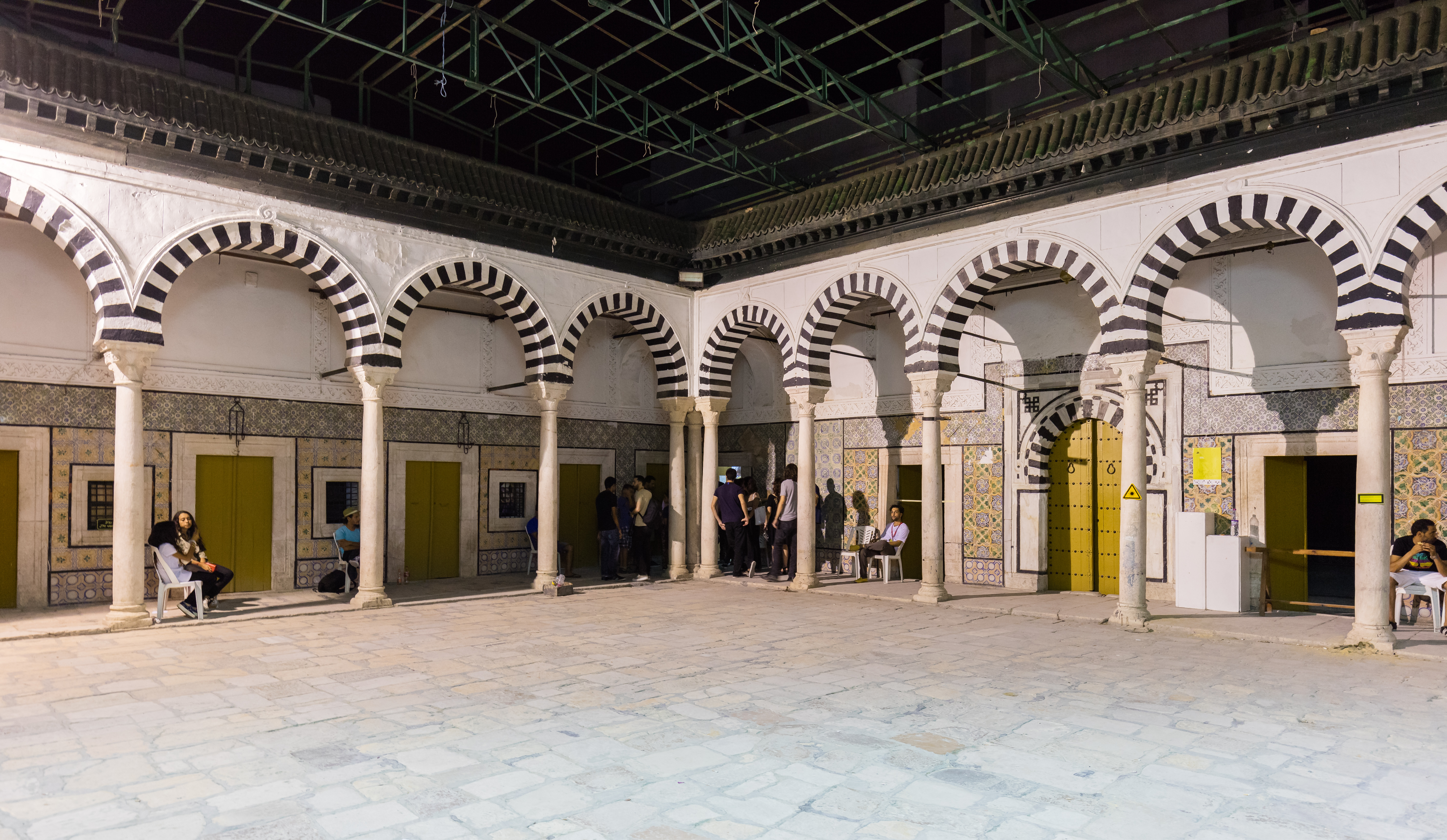
The madrasa by night

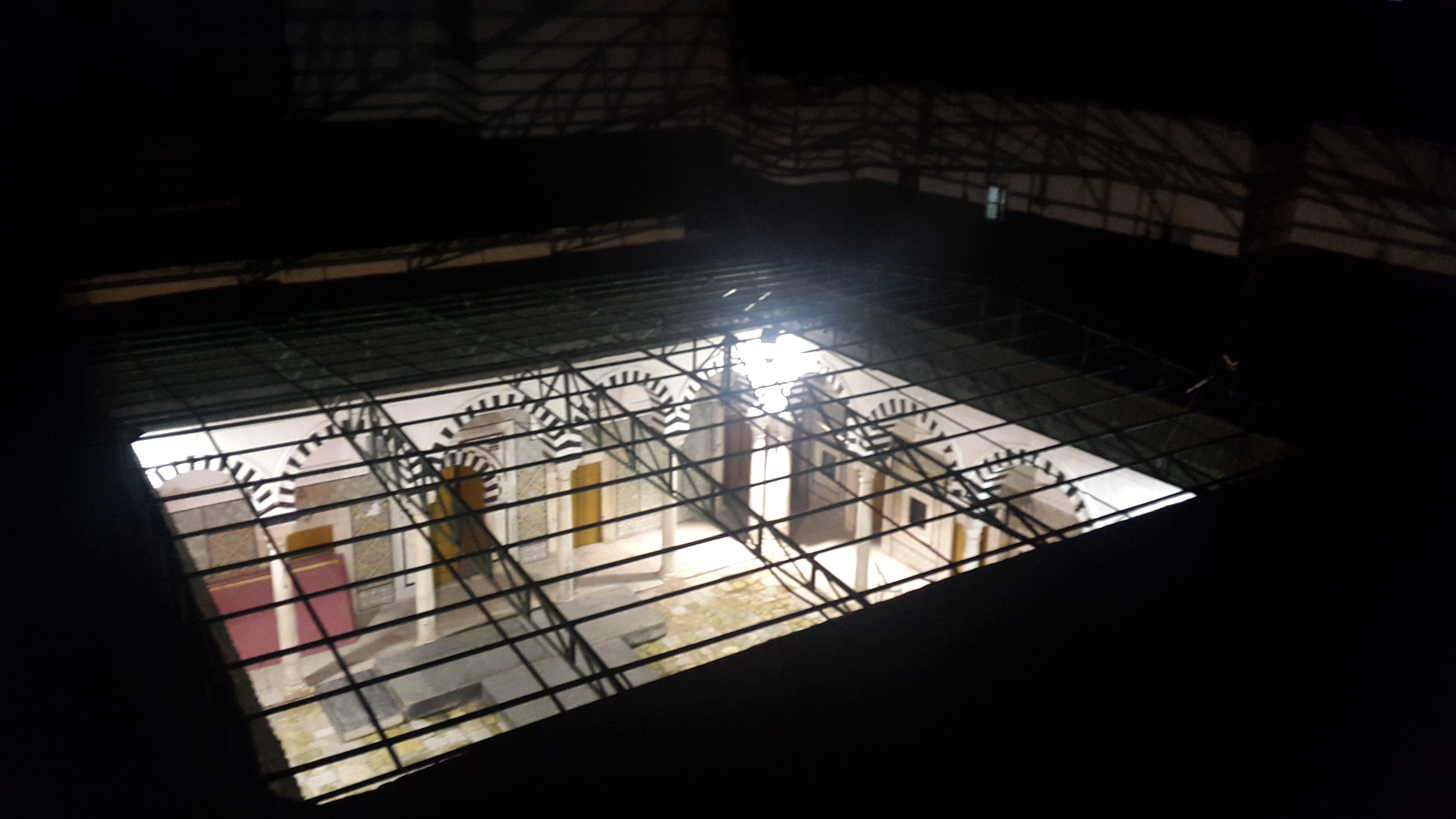
General view of the madrasa

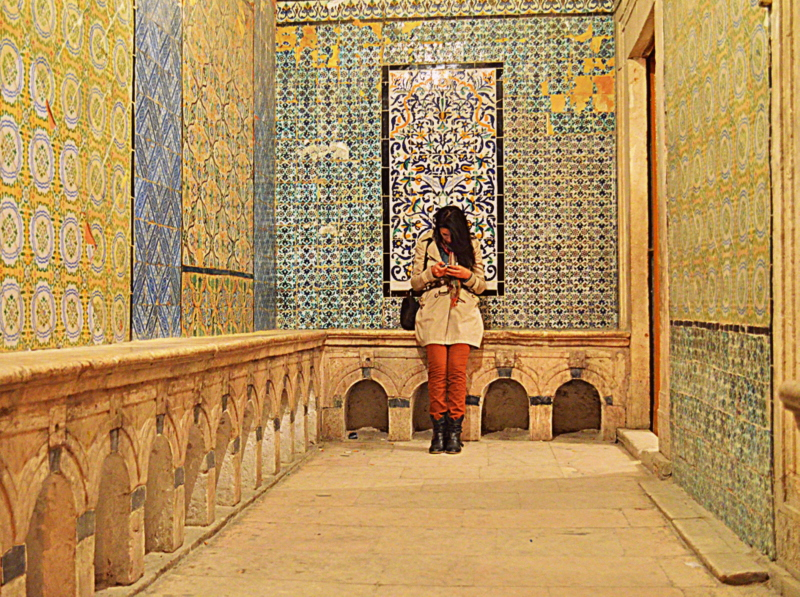
Entrance of the madrasa

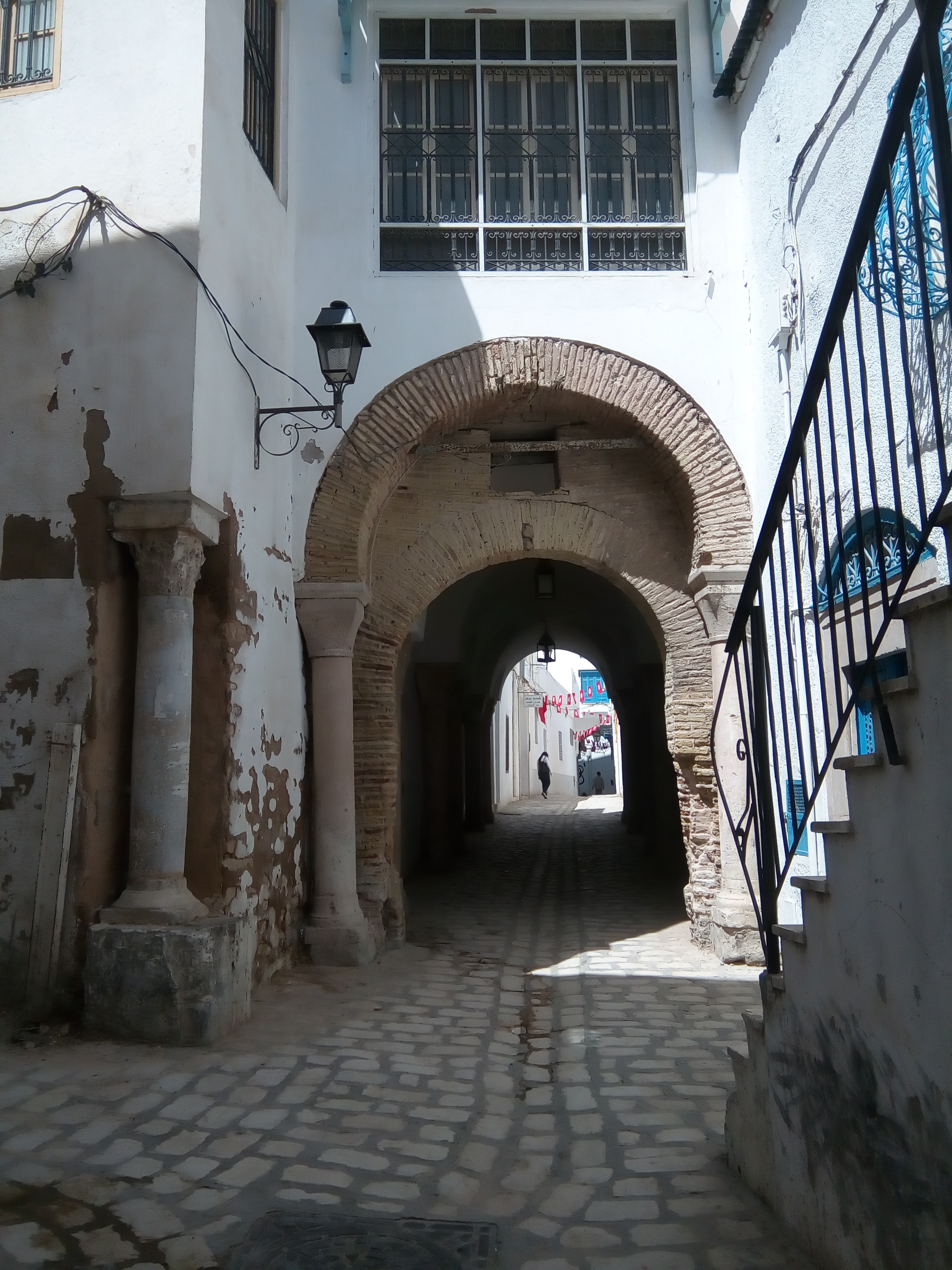
Bir Lahjar Street

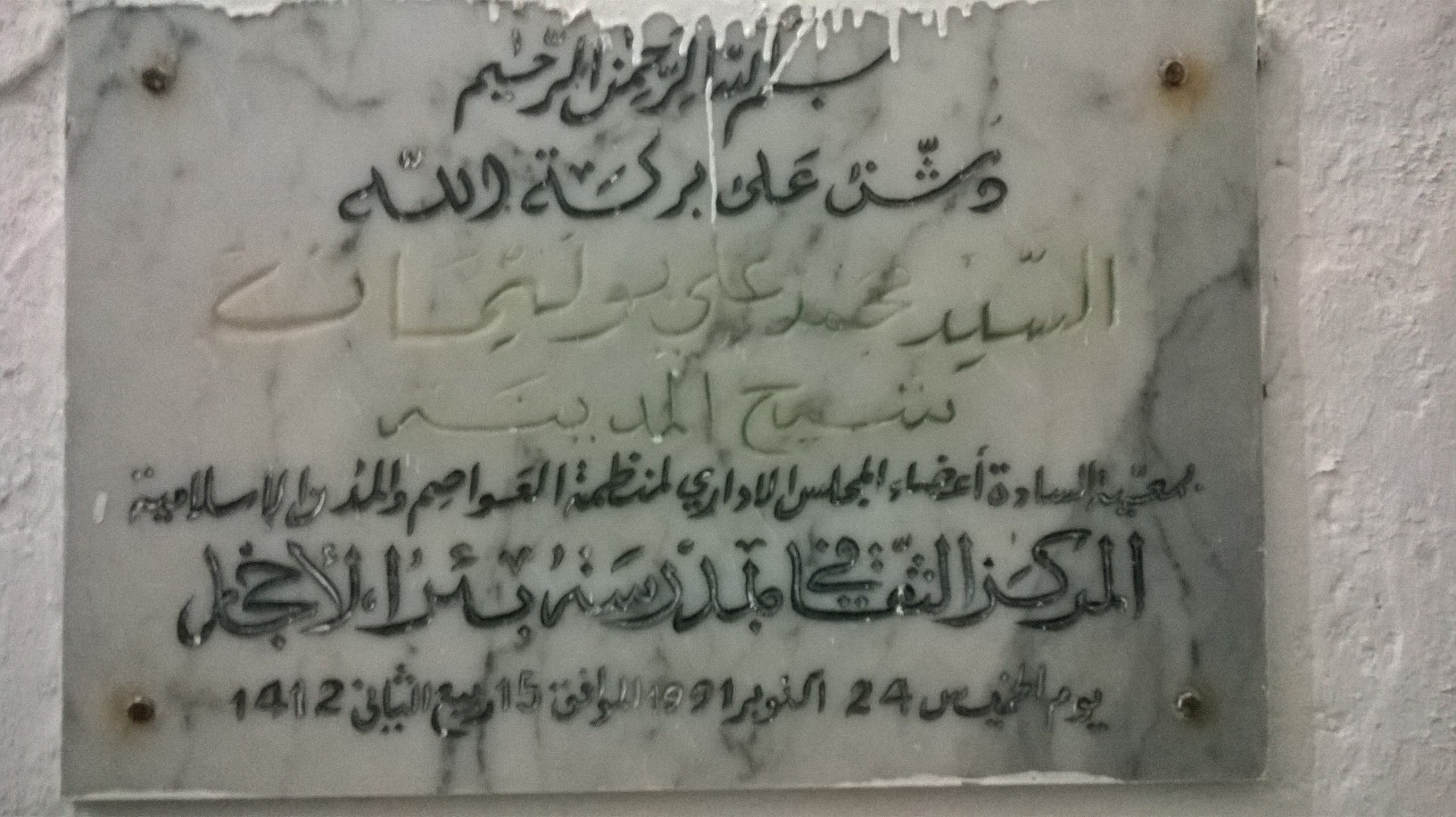
Commemorative plaque of the cultural center Bir Lahjar
