= Leïla Ladjimi-Sebaï =

Historian, archaeologist and epigrapher

Leïla Ladjimi-Sebaï is a historian, archaeologist and epigrapher, writer and poet from Tunisia. She is a specialist in the history of Roman-era women in North Africa and the history of Carthage.

== Career ==
Leïla Ladjimi Sebaï has been the Director of Research, National Heritage Institute of Tunisia since 2009, and the President of the Association 'Les amis de Carthage' since 2012. Since its inauguration in 2014, she has been a member of the Board of Directors of MUCEM, a Mediterranean Museum at Marseille. From 2002 to 2010 she was President of ICOM (Tunisia), and from 2002 to 2005 was a member of the renovation commission at Carthage Museum, where she spent the majority of her career, and is principally responsible for its large collection of Latin epigraphy. She is a writer and poet, publishing a first collection of poetry, Chams, in 1991, for which she was awarded the “Grand Prix Tahar Haddad de la Nouvelle” in Tunis.

== Education ==
Leïla Ladjimi Sebaï trained in classical dance and was a resident student at the Bolshoi Theater School in Moscow (1965-1967). Her thesis on African women in the Roman era from epigraphic sources (La femme en Afrique à l'époque romaine: À partir de la documentation épigraphique) received an award in 1977 from the University of Provence.

== Awards and prizes ==
Leïla Ladjimi Sebaï was awarded the Serge Lancel Prize from the Académie des Inscriptions et Belles Lettres (Institut de France, Paris, 2005), for her study on Carthage. In October 2010 she was awarded the rank of Officier in the Ordre des Arts et des Lettres

== Selected works ==
- Ladjimi, S. L. (2011). La femme en Afrique à l'époque romaine: À partir de la documentation épigraphique. Tunis: Institut national du patrimoine.
- Ben, A. Z., Ladjimi, S. L., Musée national de Carthage., & Maʻhad al-Waṭanī lil-Turāth (Tunisia). (2011). Catalogue des inscriptions latines païennes inédites du Musée de Carthage. Rome: École française de Rome.
- Ladjimi, S. L. (2005). La colline de Byrsa à l'époque romaine: Étude épigraphique et état de la question. Paris: C.E.A.M., Institut d'Art et d'Archéologie.
- Ladjimi, S. L. (2002). Index général des inscriptions latines païennes de Carthage. Tunis: Institut national du patrimoine.
- Dietz, S., Ladjimi, S. L., Ben, H. H., & Nationalmuseet (Denmark). (1995). Africa proconsularis: Regional studies in the Segermes Valley of Northern Tunesia. Århus: Distributed by Aarhus University Press.
- Sebaï, L. L. (1993). Elisha: Quatre chants. Tunis: Or du Temps.
- Galley, M., Ladjimi, S. L., International Association of Studies on Mediterranean Civilizations., & Maʻhad al-Qawmī lil-Āthār wa-al-Funūn bi-Tūnis. (1985). L'homme méditerranéen et la mer: Actes du troisième Congrès international d'études des cultures de la Méditerranée occidentale, Jerba, avril 1981. Tunis: Editions Salammbô.
- Ben, A. Z., & Ladjimi, S. L. (1983). Index onomastique des inscriptions latines de la Tunisie. Paris: Editions du Centre national de la recherche scientifique.
