= National Heritage Institute (Tunisia) =

Government organization in Tunisia

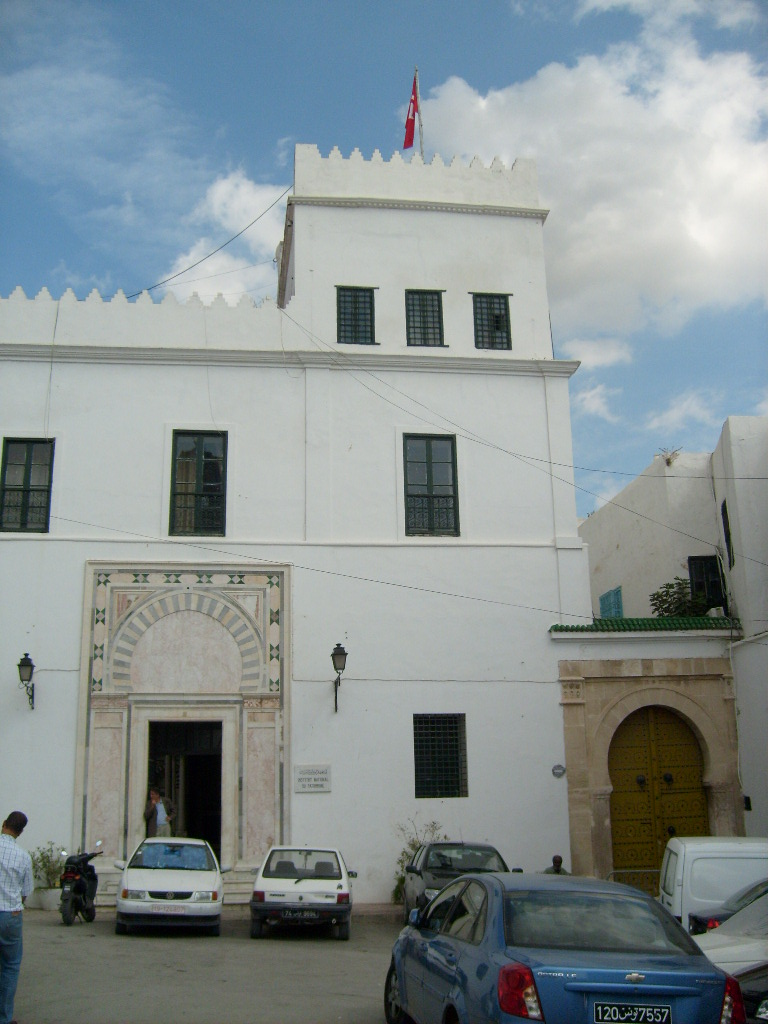
Facade of the institute

The National Heritage Institute (French: L'Institut national du patrimoine) (Arabic: المعهد الوطني للتراث) (INP) is a Tunisian public administrative institution responsible for dealing with Tunisian heritage. It has its headquarters in the Medina of Tunis. It has its origins in 1885 which is when the Department of Antiquities and Arts decided to start conducting real scientific studies of archaeological sites. It became the Directorate of Antiquities, and was replaced by the National Institute of Archaeology and Art (INAA) in 1957. In 1993 it received its current name. Its Director of Research is Leïla Ladjimi Sebaï.

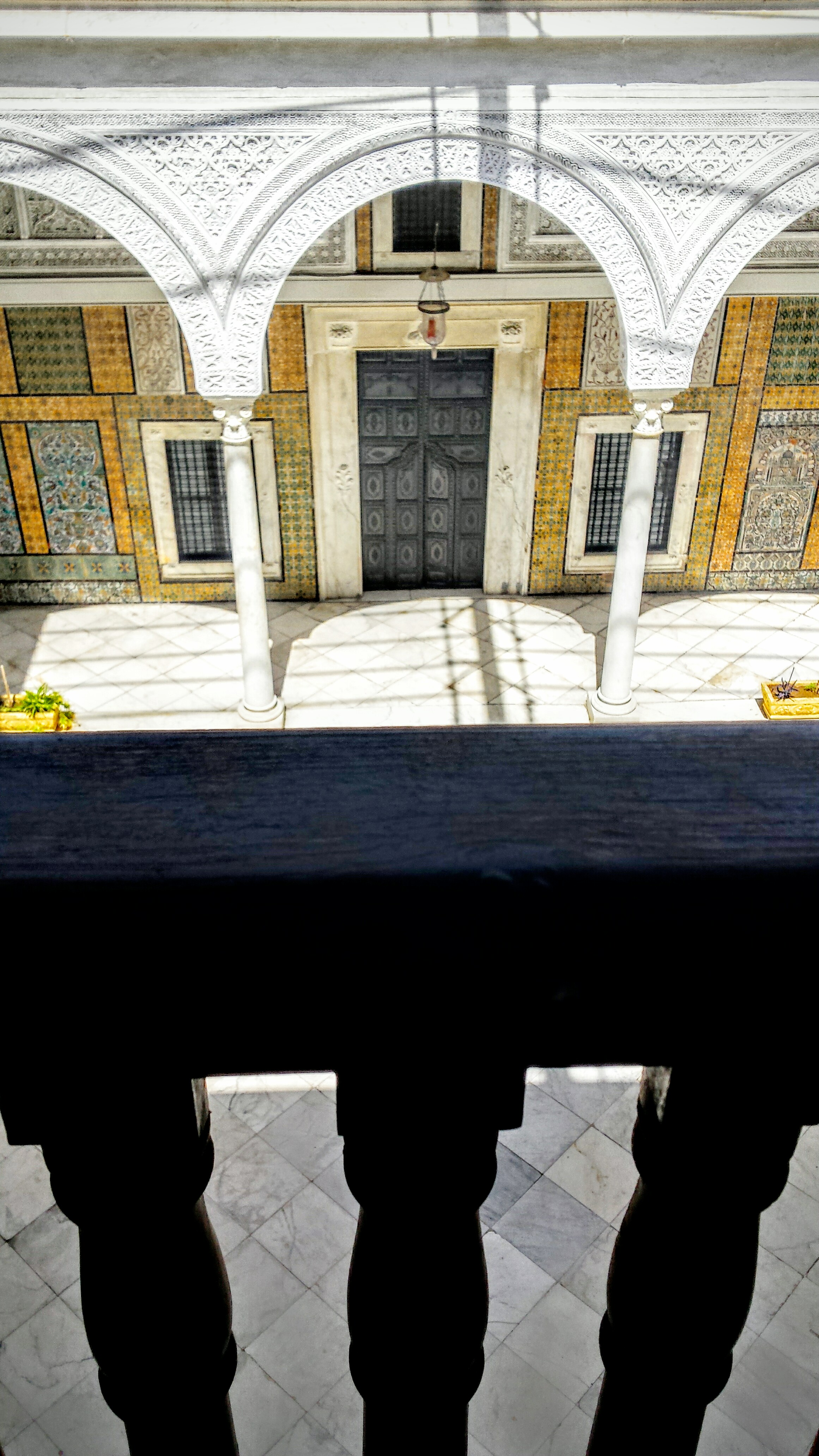
Inside of the institute

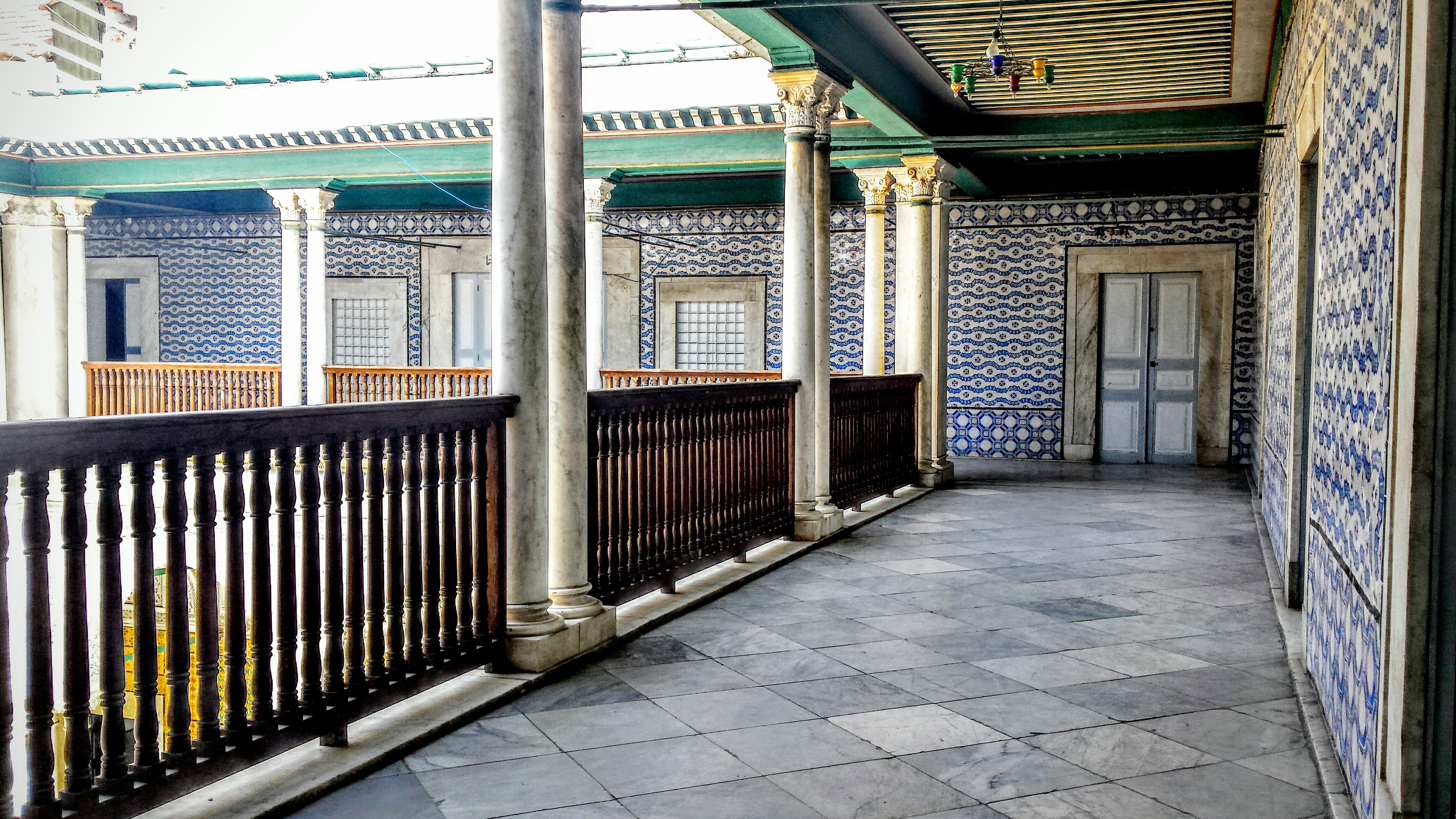
First floor of the institute

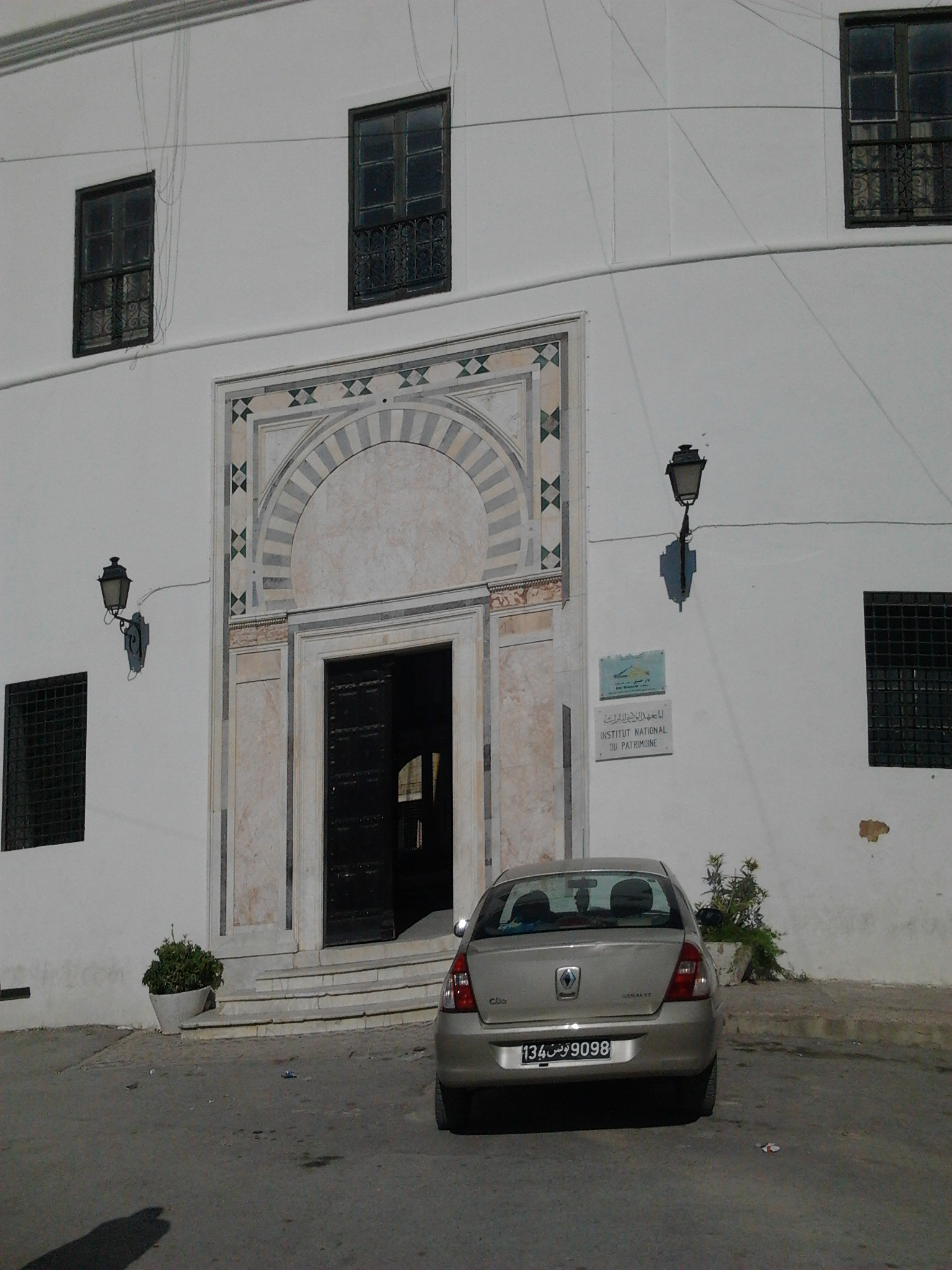
Entrance of the institute

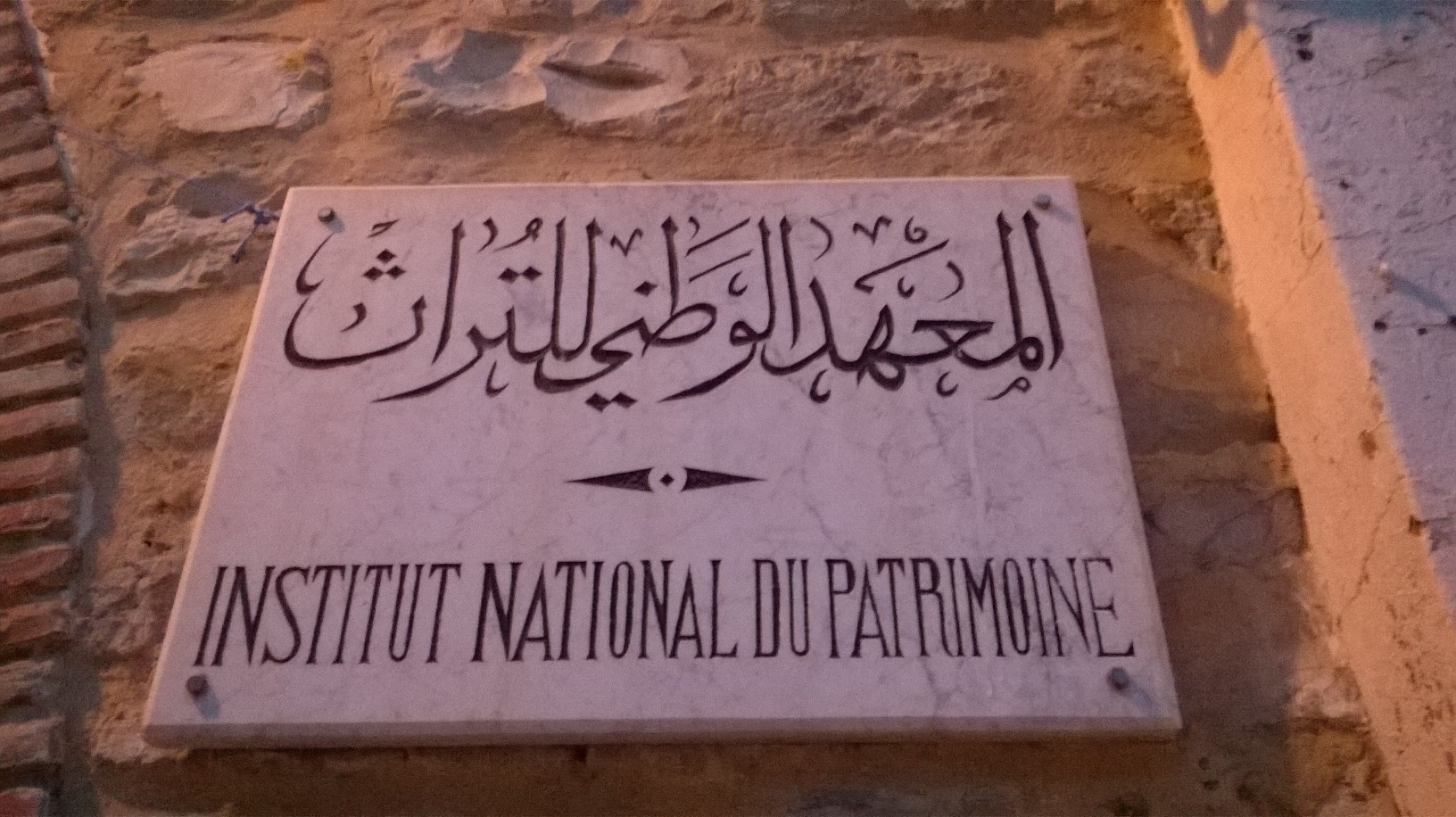
Marble plaque of the institute
