= Souk El Kachachine =

Tunisian marketplace

Coordinates: 36.796420°N 10.171199°E

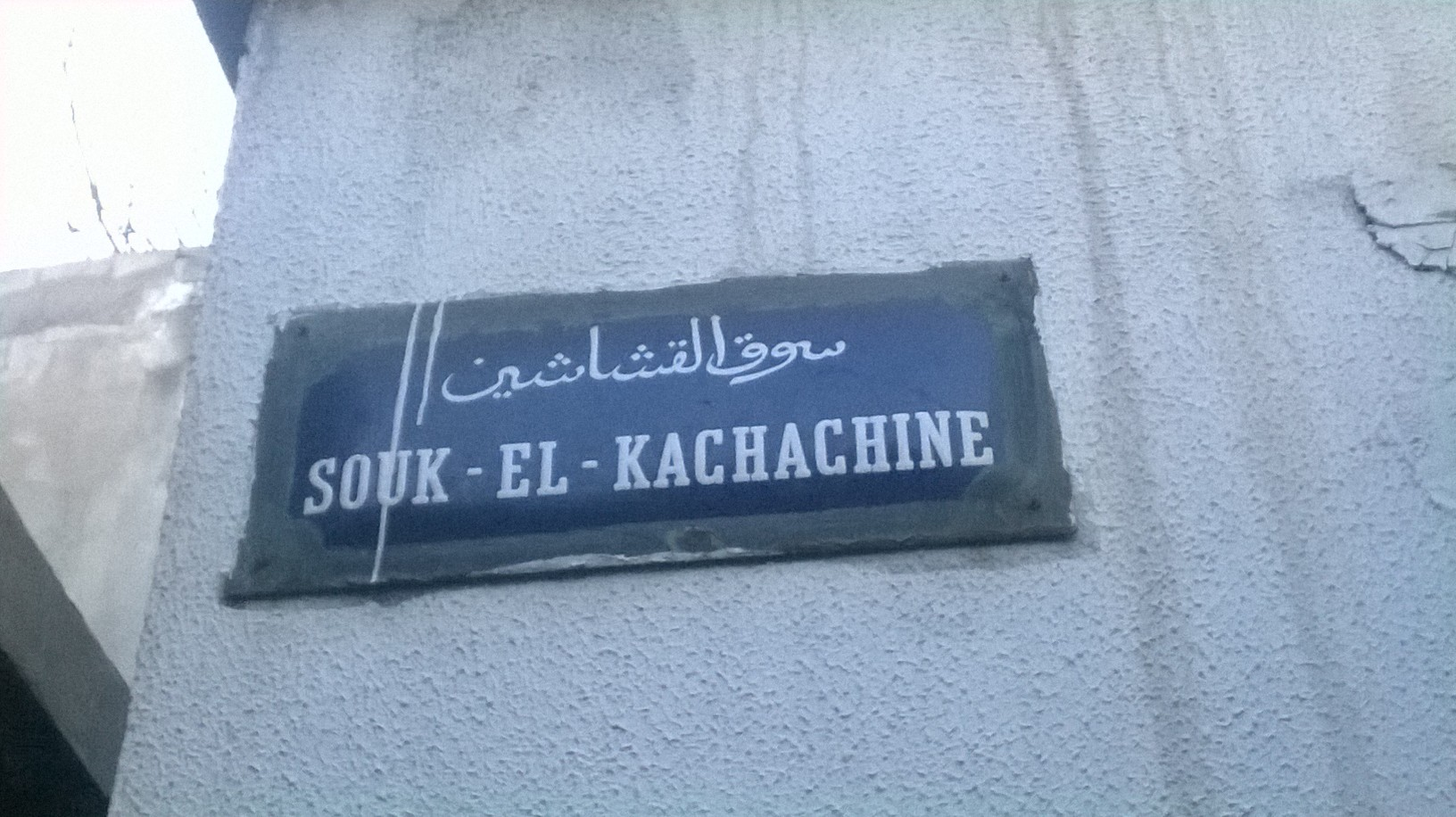
Metallic plaque of souk El Kachachine

Souk El Kachachine is one of the souks of the medina of Tunis. It is specialized in selling second-hand clothes.

== Location ==
It is located in the east of Al-Zaytuna Mosque, near souk El Nissa.

== History ==
The souk was founded during the Hafsid era between 1128 and 1535.

== Monuments ==
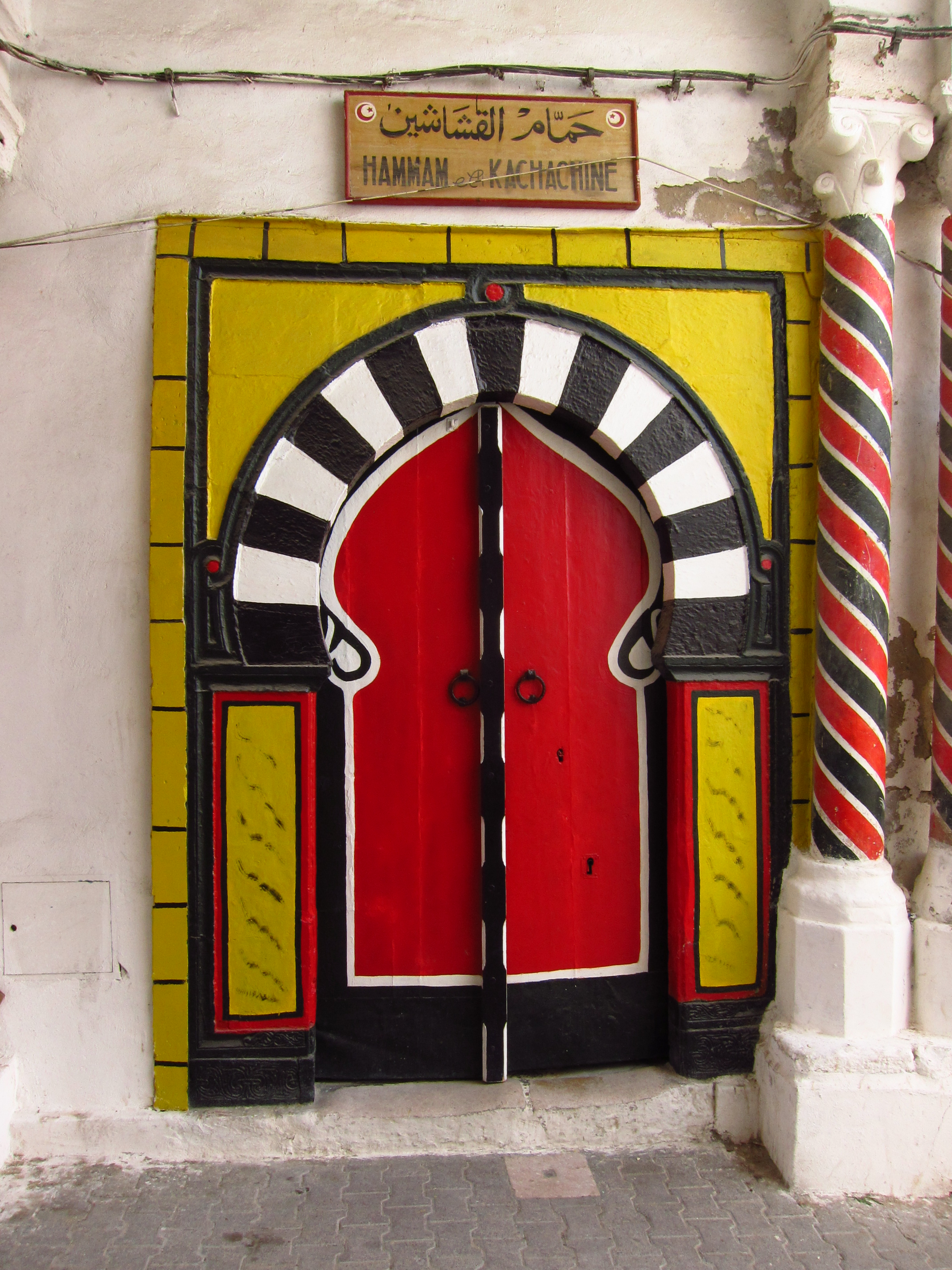
Entrance of hammam El Kachachine

Hammam El Kachachine is located in this souk.
