= Madrasa El Bachia =

Madrasa in Tunis, Tunisia

Coordinates: 36.7969°N 10.1719°E

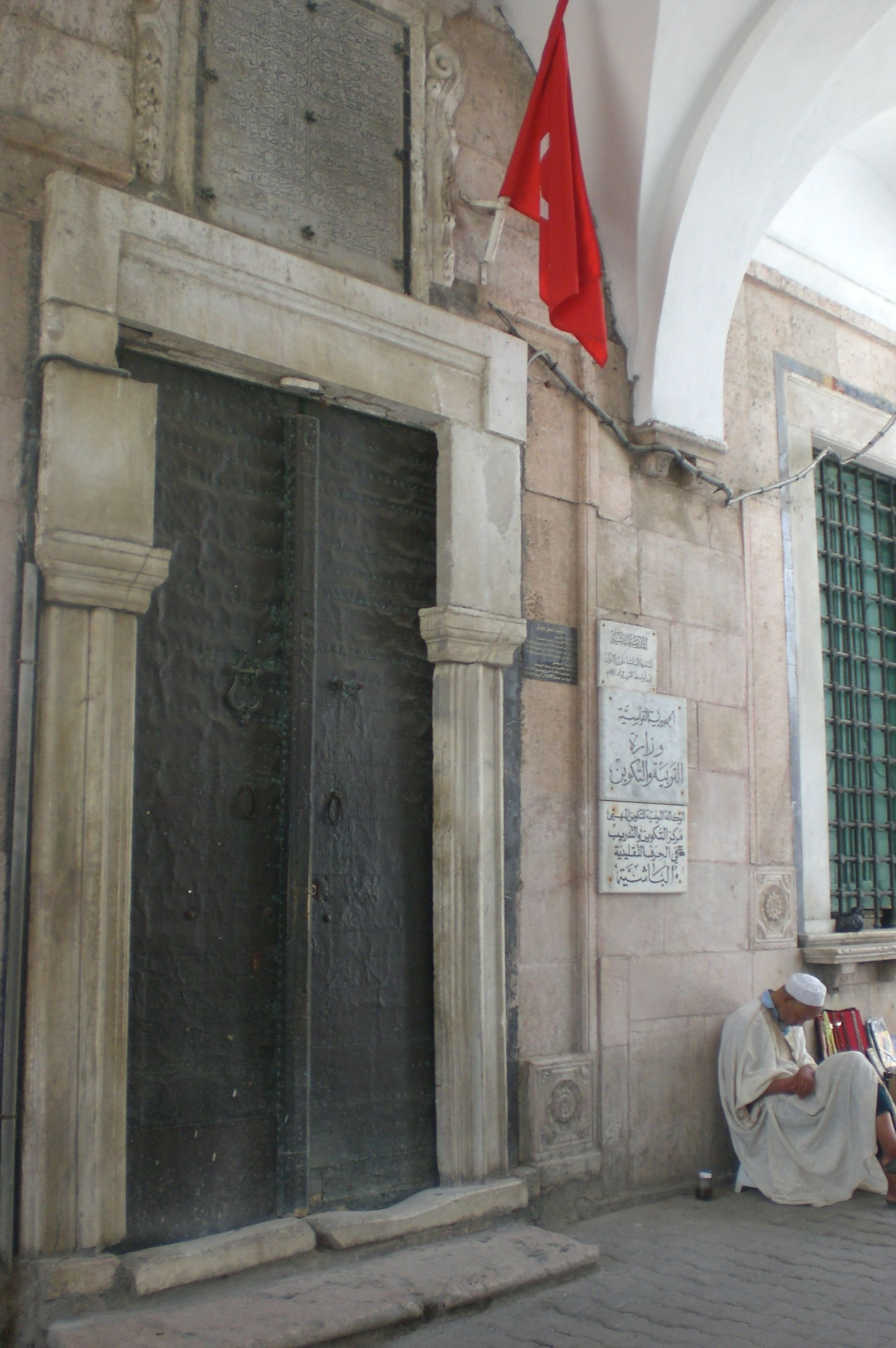
Entrance of the madrasa

Madrasa El Bachia (Arabic: المدرسة الباشية) is one of the madrasahs of the medina of Tunis, located in the Rue des Libraires, near the Al-Zaytuna Mosque and in front of the Guachachine Hammam.

== History ==
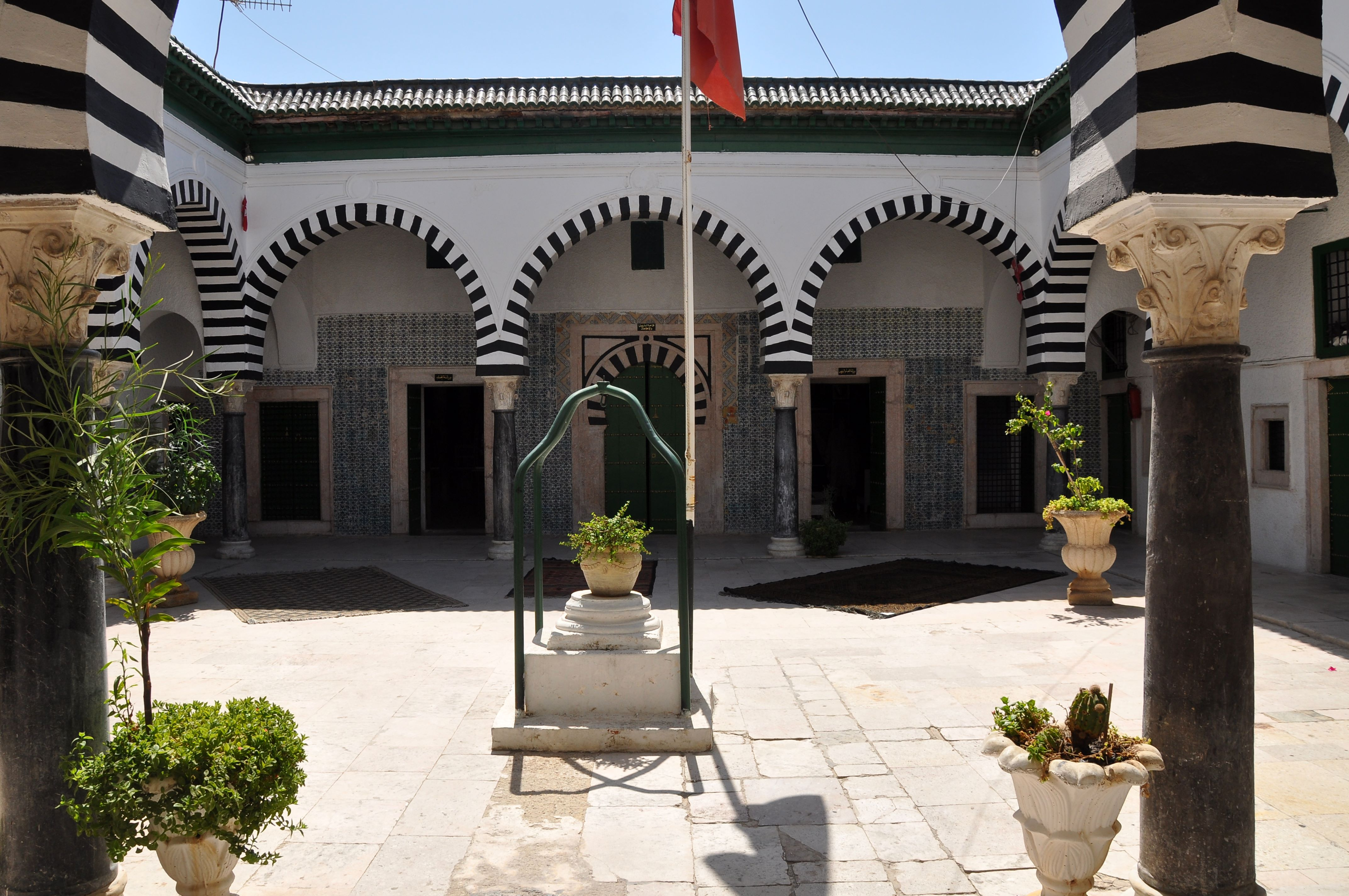
Courtyard of the madrasa

Madrasa El Bachia was built in 1752 during the reign of the Husainid Abu l-Hasan Ali I. It was dedicated to the Hanafi education.

In the 1980s, and with the help of the ministry of Vocational Training and Employment, the madrasa was re-established once more as a training center.

== Description ==
The madrasa has 13 rooms for students, a prayer room and a library. It has a public fountain close to the entrance, added later for visitors.

The building showcases the classical architecture of a madrasa: the courtyard gives access to the rooms through porticos surrounding three sides while the fourth gave access to the prayer room and the library.

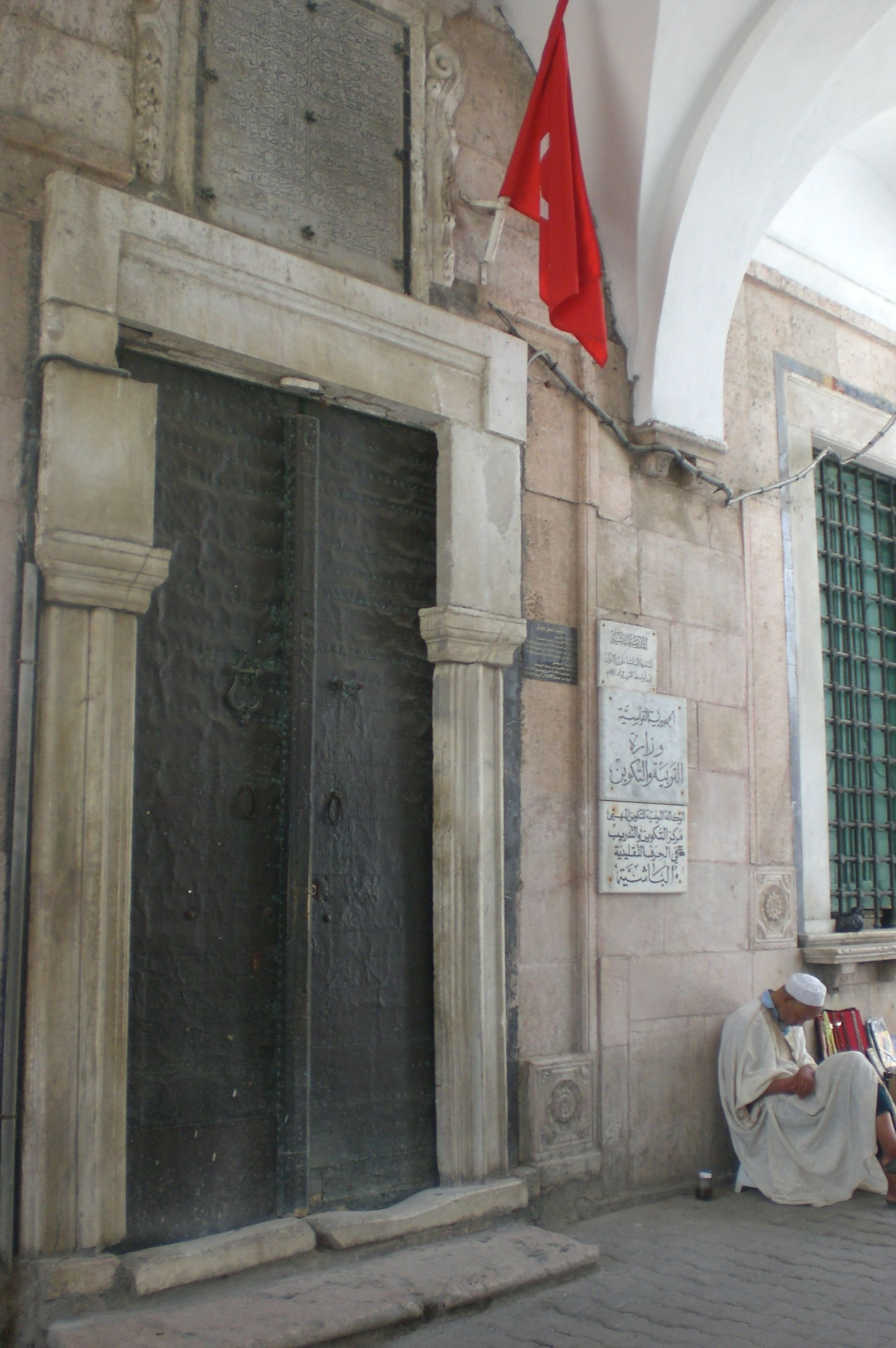
Door of the madrasa

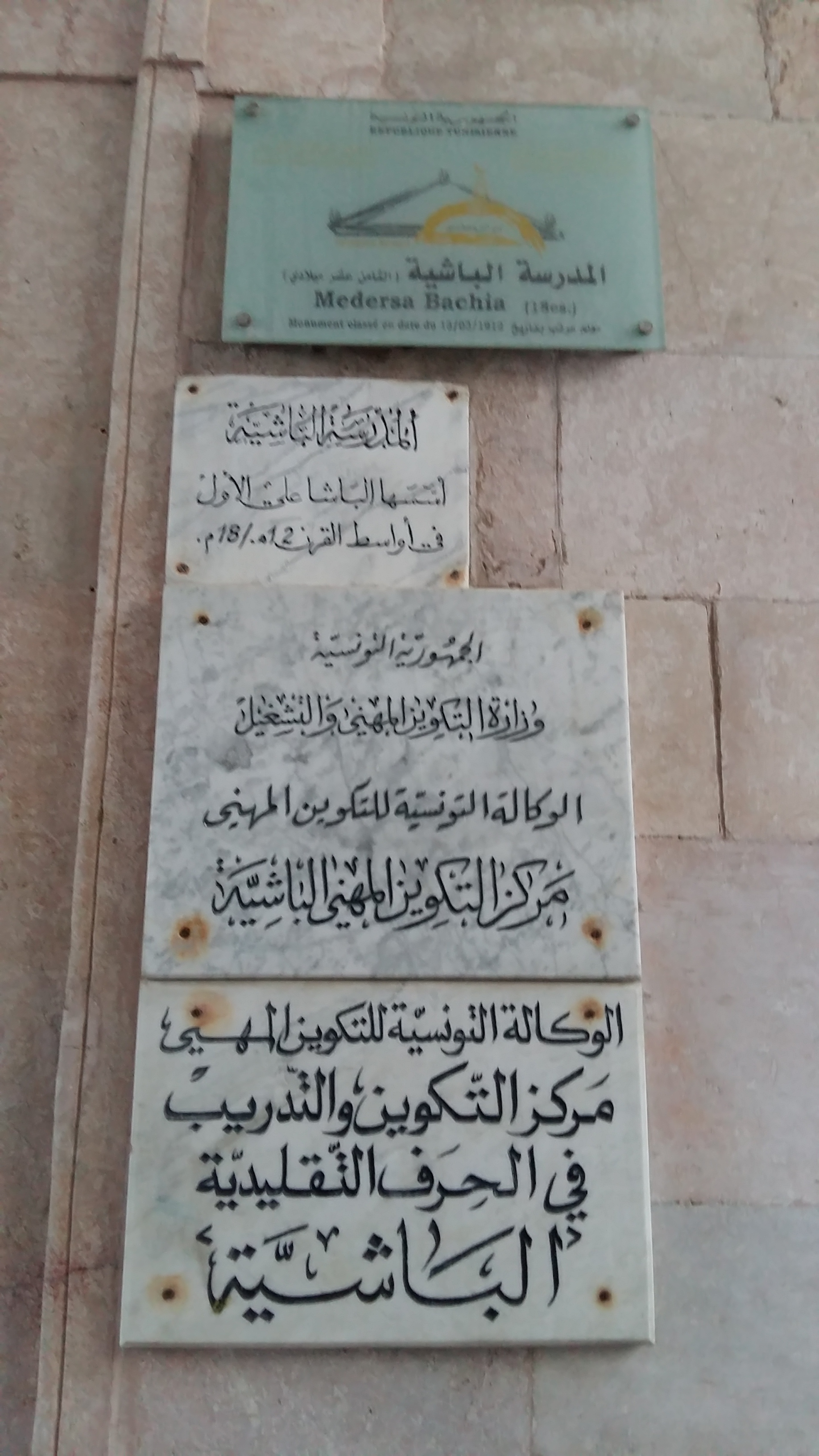
Commemorative plaque

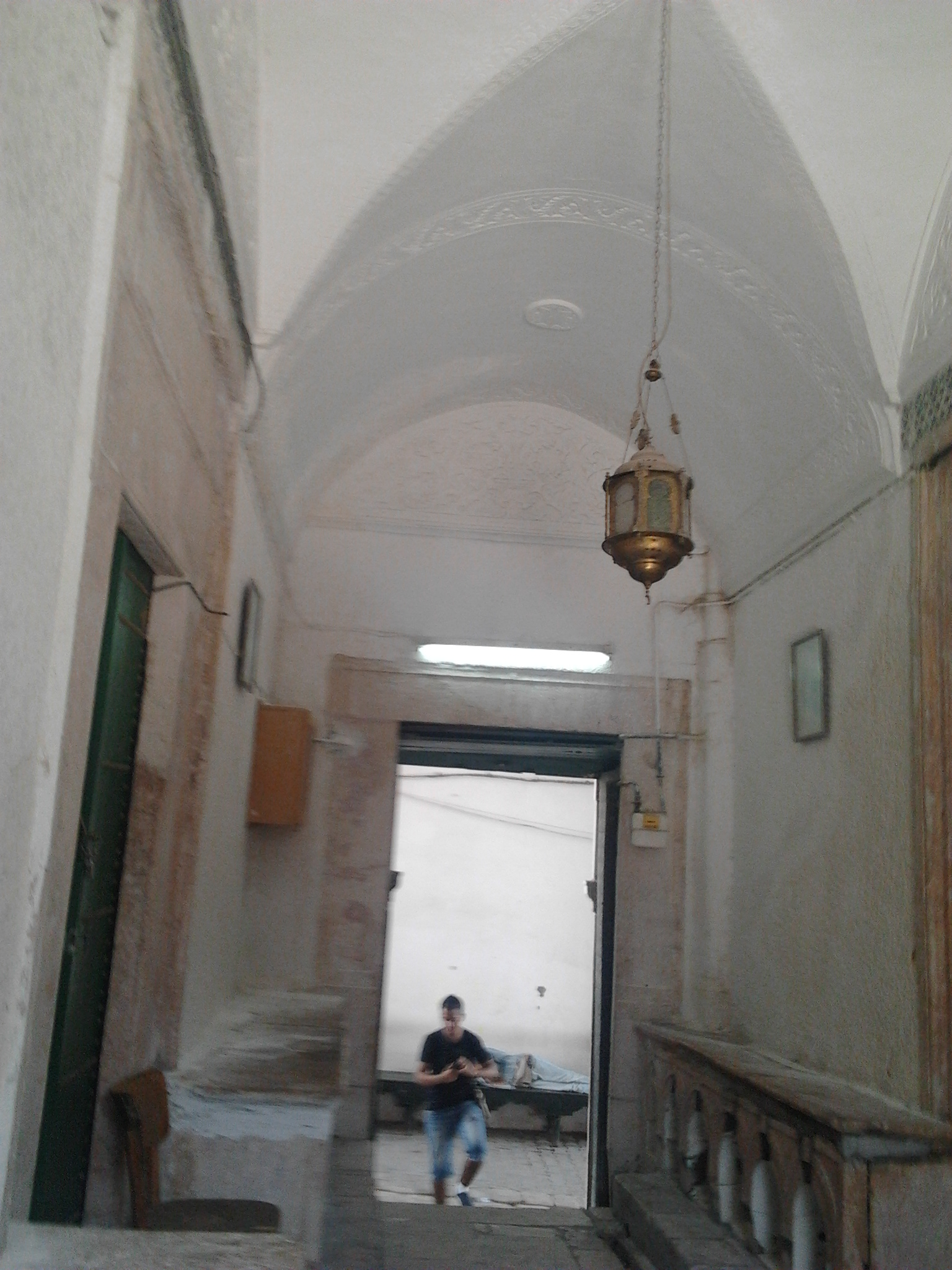
Vestibule of the madrasa

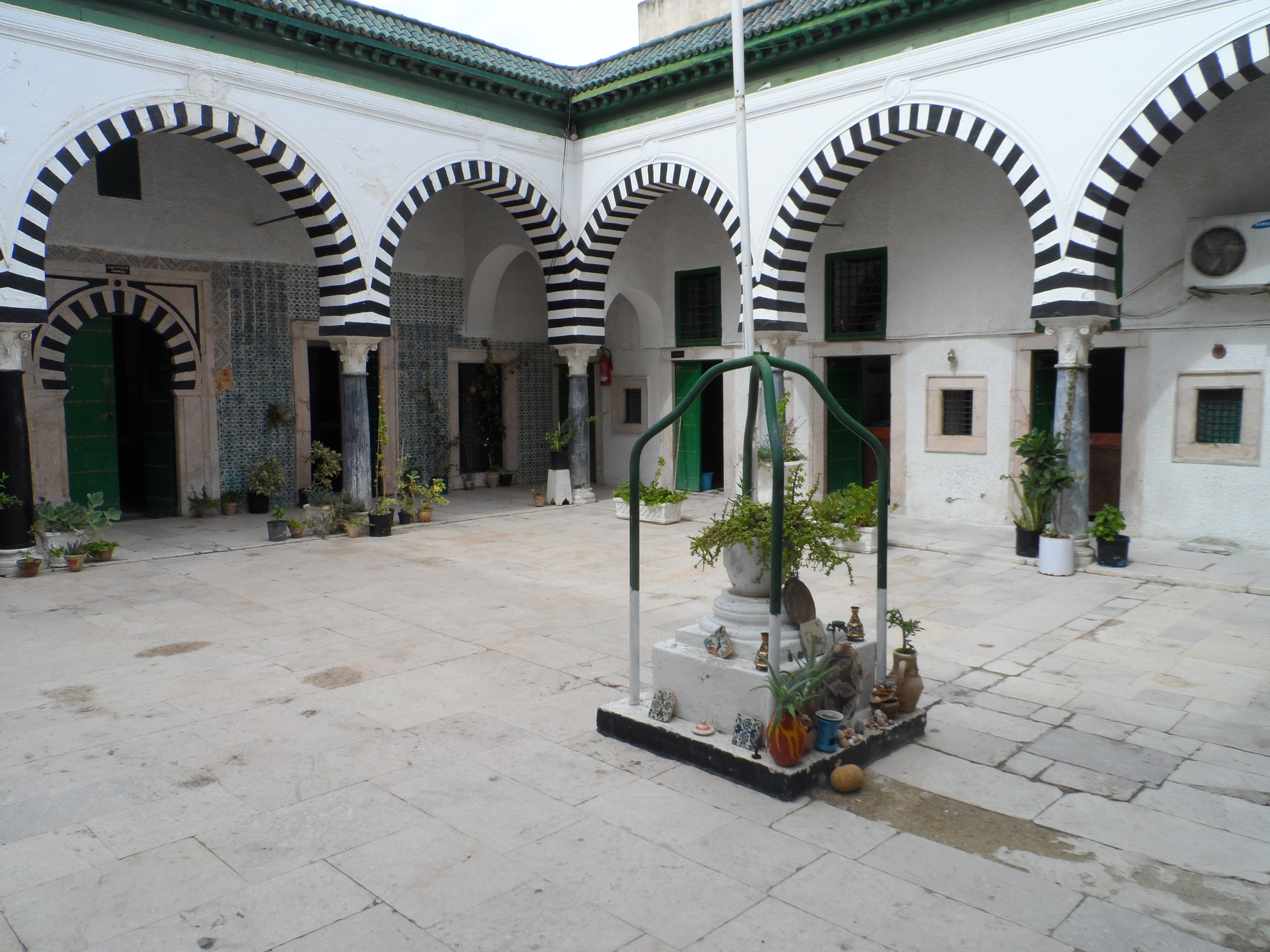
Court of the madrasa
