= Bahsita Mosque =

Mosque in Aleppo, Syria

- جَامِع بَحْسِيتَا
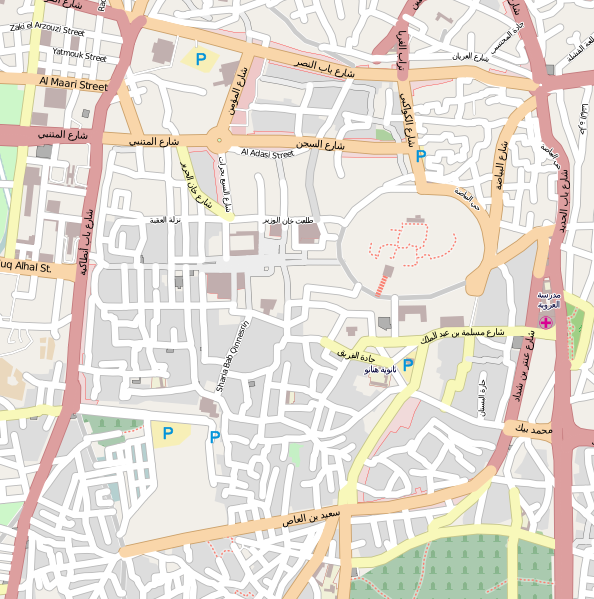
- Location of the mosque in the Ancient City of Aleppo

Religion
- Affiliation: Islam
- Ecclesiastical or organisational status: Mosque
- Status: Active

Location
- Location: Aleppo
- Country: Syria
- Interactive map of Bahsita Mosque
- Coordinates: 36°12′14″N 37°09′14″E

Architecture
- Type: Islamic architecture
- Style: Mamluk
- Completed: 1350 CE

Specifications
- Minaret: 1
- Materials: Stone
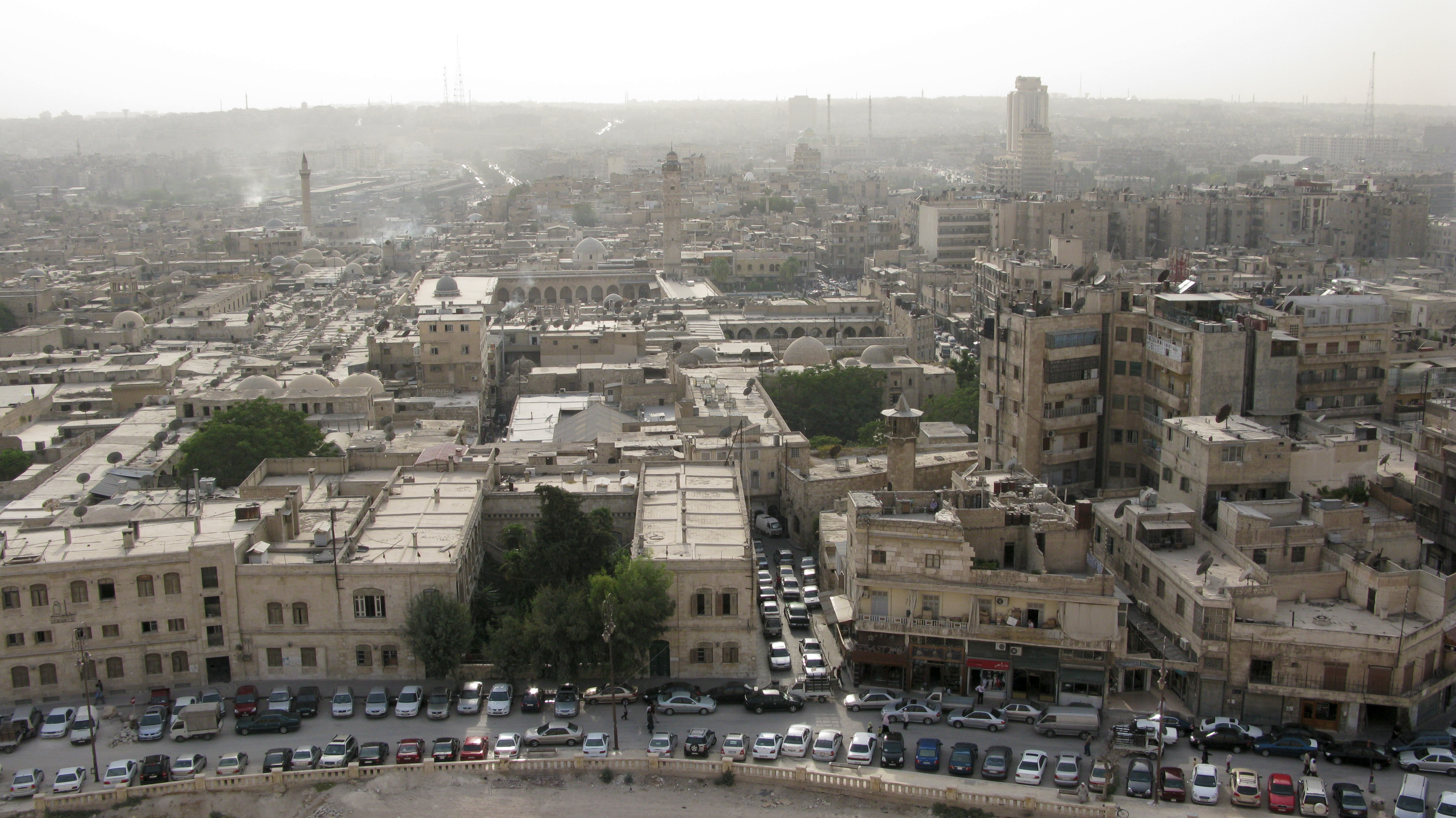
- Ancient Aleppo

UNESCO World Heritage Site
- Official name: Ancient City of Aleppo
- Location: Aleppo, Syria
- Includes: Citadel of Aleppo, Al-Madina Souq
- Criteria: Cultural: (iii), (iv)
- Reference: 21
- Inscription: 1986 (10th Session)
- Endangered: 2013–2020
- Area: 364 ha (1.41 sq mi)

The Bahsita Mosque (Arabic: جَامِع بَحْسِيتَا, romanized: Jāmiʿ Baḥsītā), also known as Sita Mosque, is a mosque in Aleppo, Syria, dating from the Mamluk period. It is located in al-Aqaba district of the Ancient City of Aleppo, a World Heritage Site, near the Bab al-Faraj Clock Tower and the National Library of Aleppo.

== Overview ==
The mosque was built in 1350 CE. According to the Aleppine historian Sheikh Kamel al-Ghazzi, the name of the mosque is derived from the Syriac name of the neighbourhood Bet Hasiota (Arabic: بَيْت حَسِيُوتَا, romanized: Bayt Ḥasiyūtā) or Bet Hasda (Arabic: بَيْت حَسْدَا, romanized: Bayt Ḥasdā), meaning the house of purity.

In 1911, the mosque's octagonal minaret was moved to the eastern side of the building to allow enough space to widen the nearby street.

== See also ==
- Islam in Syria
- List of mosques in Aleppo
- List of mosques in Syria
