= Aleppo Centre for Culture and Arts =

Coordinates: 36°12′07″N 37°08′47″E

The Aleppo Centre for Culture and Arts (Arabic: مركز حلب للثقافة والفنون) is a proposed project for a cultural complex-institute in Aleppo, Syria. The complex will be home to the new National Library of Aleppo and the Aleppo Opera House. The location of the proposed complex is near the Saadallah al-Jabiri Square, at the heart of Aleppo city.

The complex was scheduled to be constructed between 2003 and 2007 but the process was delayed for many years due to financial difficulties. In 2011, The Aleppo governorate announced for a new design competition in order to start the construction works. Due to the political turbulence in Syria, the outcome of the competition was never decided and the future of the project is still open.

== Details ==
The Aleppo Centre for Culture and Arts will be consisted of three main institutions:

- The National Library: will be able to host a collection of more than 1 million books, with 14 reading saloons, three large halls for lectures and an exhibition hall.
- The Opera House: with a capacity of 1,600 seats.
- The Dramatic Arts Theatre: with 500 seats.

== See also ==
- Music of Syria
- National Library of Aleppo
