= King Faisal Street (disambiguation) =

King Faisal Street can refer to streets named after Faisal I of Iraq:

- King Faisal Street (Amman)
- King Faisal Street (Aleppo)

King Faisal Street can also refer to streets named after Faisal of Saudi Arabia:

- King Faisal Street (Riyadh)
