= King Faisal Street (Aleppo) =

Street in Aleppo, Syria

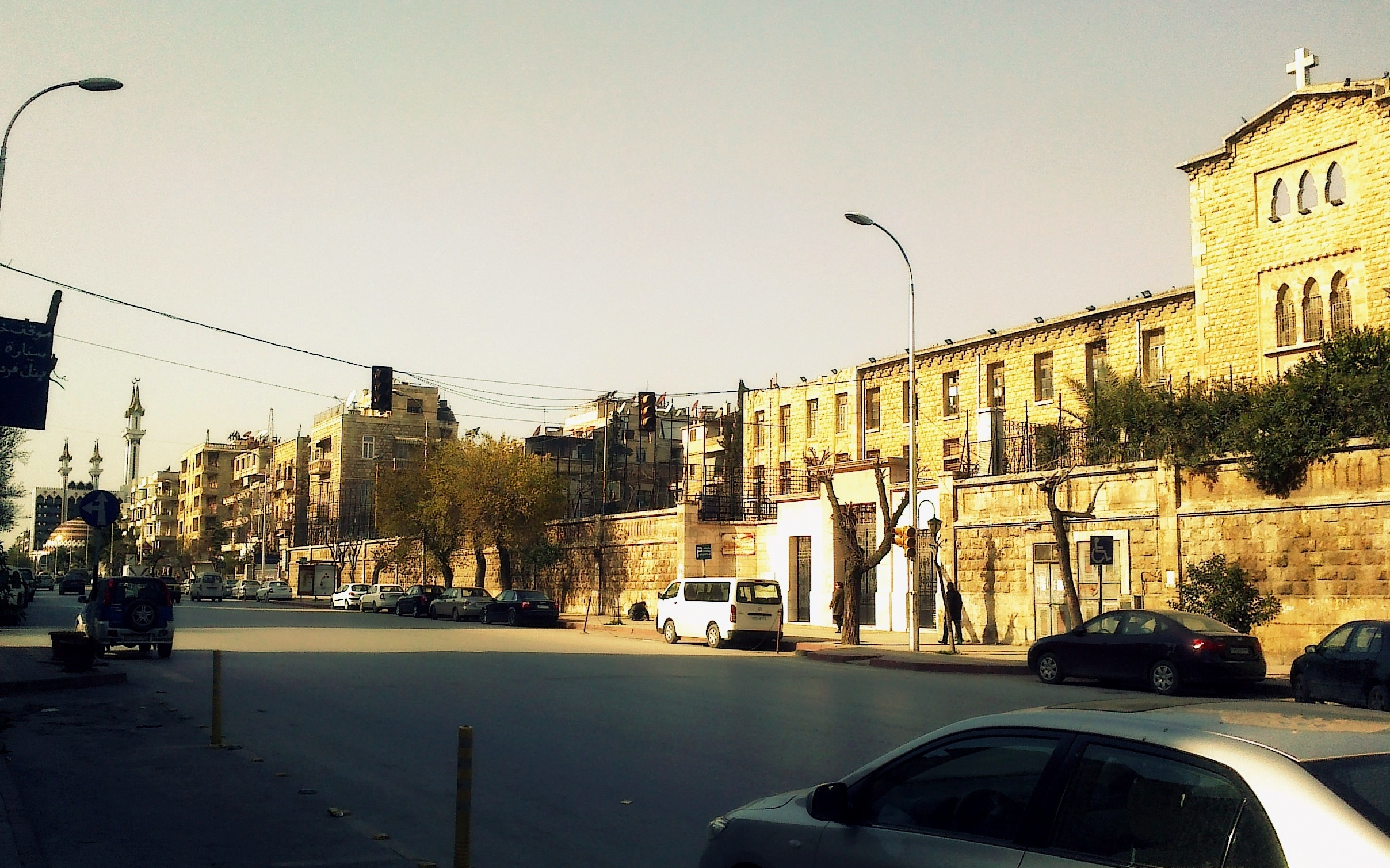
- Saint Matilda Church and ar-Rahman Mosque at King Faisal Street
- Interactive map of King Faisal Street
- Native name: شارع الملك فيصل (Arabic)
- Length: 2.5 km (1.6 mi)
- Location: Al-Jamiliyah and al-Sabil districts, Aleppo, Syria
- Coordinates: 36°12′47″N 37°08′28″E

Construction
- Inauguration: 1919

King Faisal Street (Arabic: شارع الملك فيصل) is a main street in central Aleppo, Syria. Located to the northwest of the Saadallah Al-Jabiri Square connecting the Aleppo Public Park with Al-Sabil Park. The street ends up with Shihan Square to the north of the city centre.

== History ==
King Faisal street was founded in 1919, to connect al-Jamiliyah district at the city centre with al-Sabil park, through the Syriac district. It was named in the honour of Faisal I the king of Syria.

In 1964, the Saint Matilda Melkite Greek church was opened on the street. Later in 1994, Al-Rahman mosque was built on the street, adjacent to al-Sabil park.

The street served as a highway until 2008 when the separating green row of trees was removed and the street was turned to a single-way avenue.

== Gallery ==
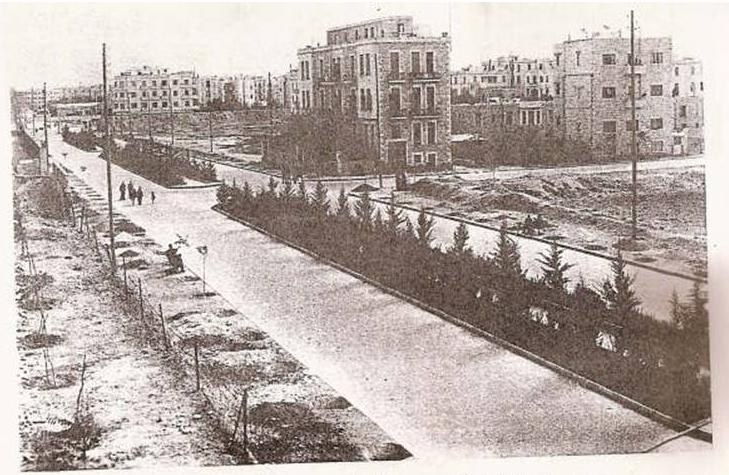
King Faisal street in 1950

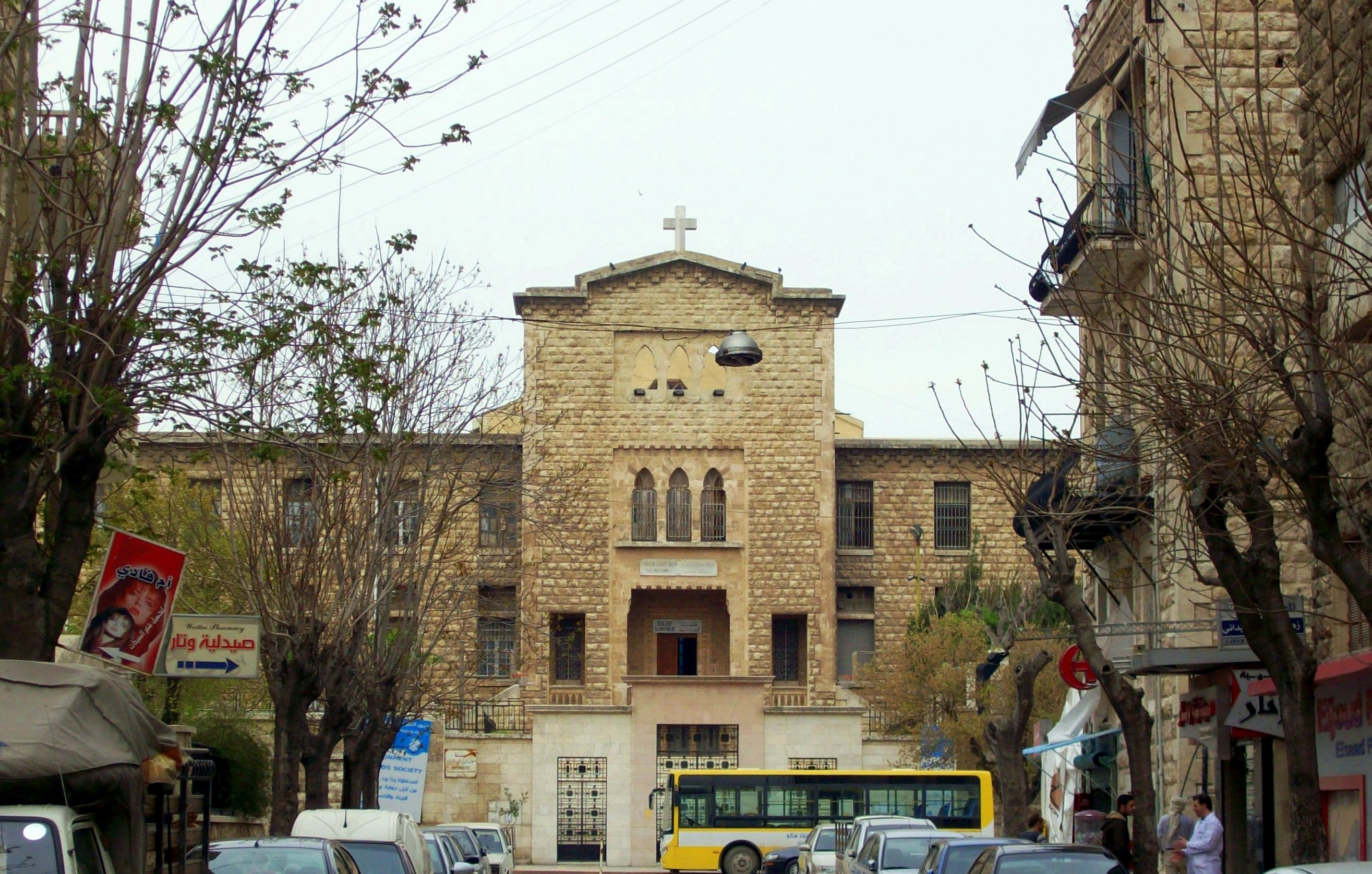
Saint Matilda church

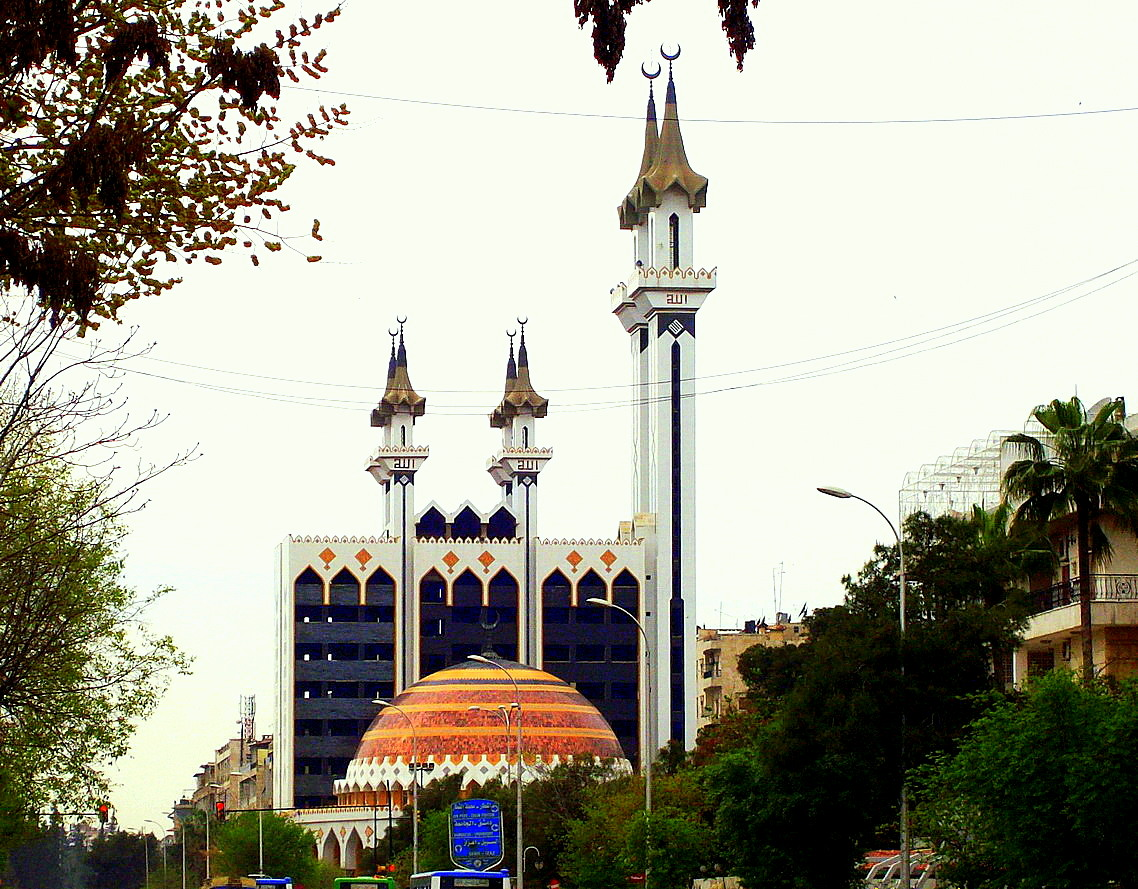
Al-Rahman mosque on Faisal street
