= October 2012 Aleppo bombings =

Terrorist incident in Syria

Coordinates: 36°12′25″N 37°08′51″E

- Part of Syrian Civil War
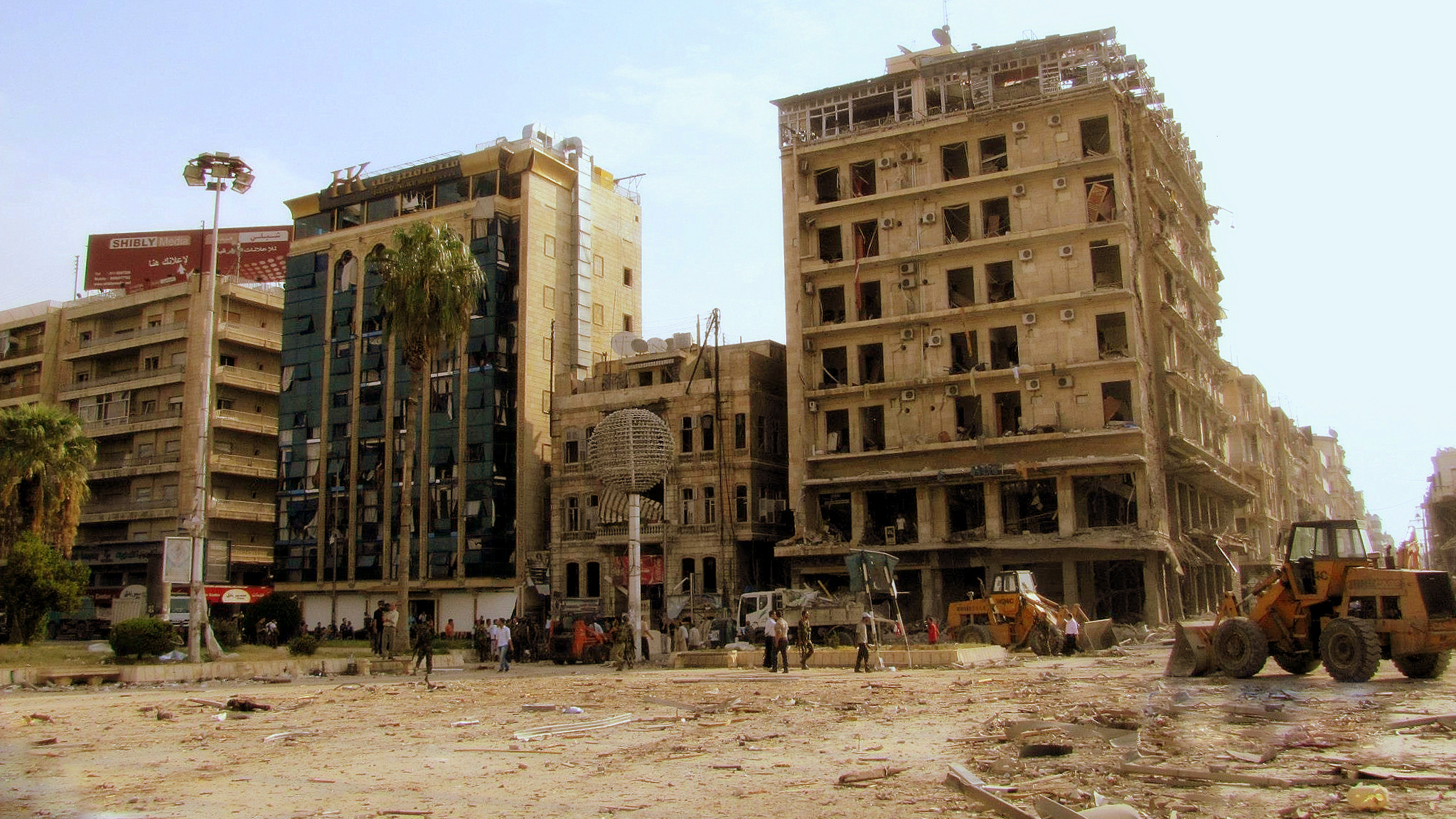
- Location: Aleppo, Syria
- Date: 3 October 2012; 08:00 (UTC+3)
- Target: Saadallah Al-Jabiri Square and the nearby areas
- Attack type: 3 suicide car bombs
- Deaths: 40 (mostly civilians)
- Injuries: 122

On 3 October 2012, three suicide car bombs exploded at the eastern corner of the Saadallah Al-Jabiri Square, killing 40 people. At least 122 people were reported injured. The bombs targeted an officers' club, nearby buildings of the Touristic Hotel, the historic "Jouha Café" and the Mirage Hotel near Bab Jnen. Both hotels and the surrounding buildings suffered extensive damage while the Jouha café was destroyed. A small building within the officers' club was also ruined.

== See also ==
- List of bombings during the Syrian Civil War
