= Al-Sabil Park =

Park in Aleppo, Syria

- Interactive map of Al-Sabil Park
- Type: Municipal
- Location: Al-Sabil district, Aleppo, Syria
- Coordinates: 36°13′09″N 37°08′00″E
- Area: 6 hectares (15 acres)
- Created: 1895
- Operator: Aleppo city council
- Status: Open all year from 6 AM to 12 PM

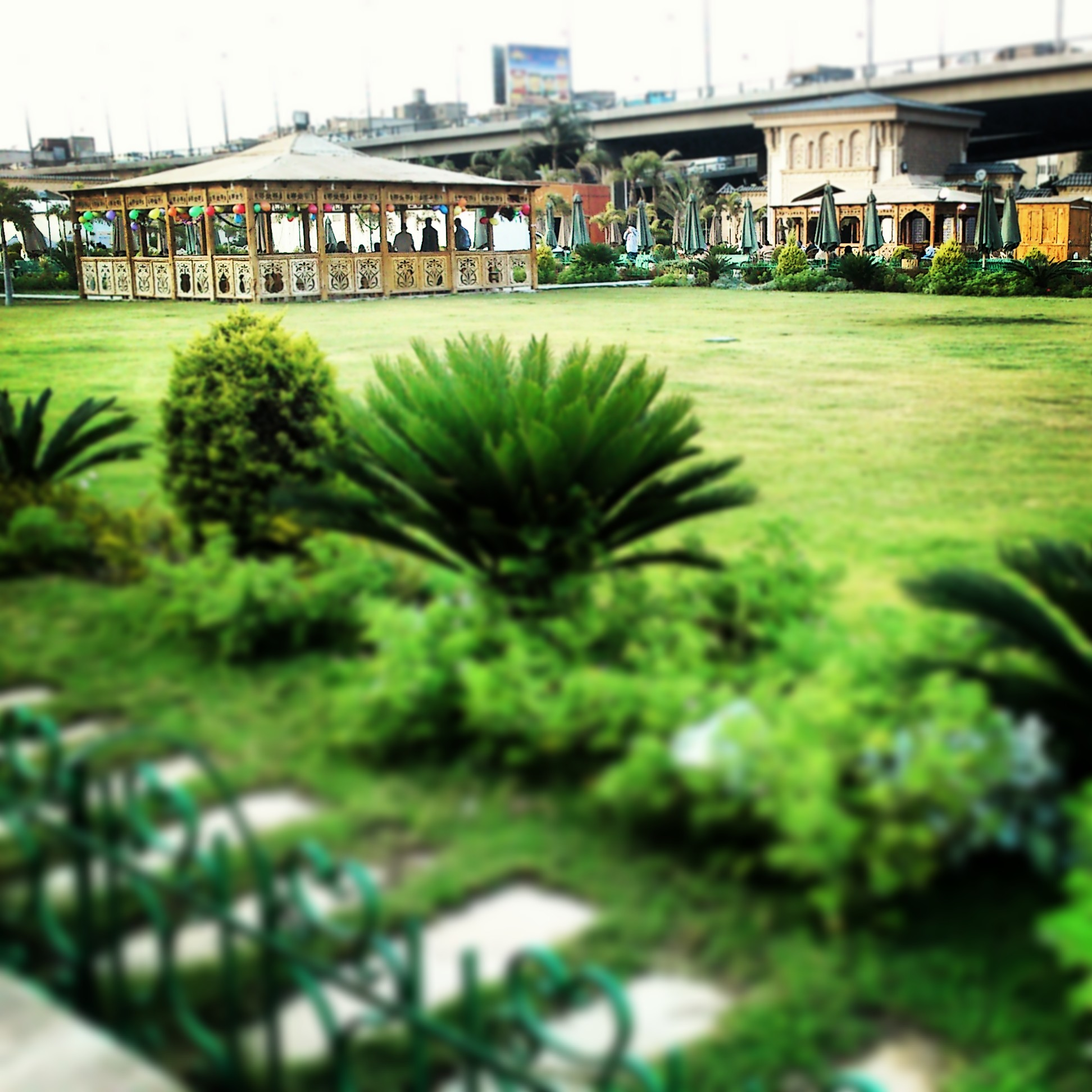
Al-Sabil Park

Al-Sabil Park (Arabic: حديقة السبيل) is a 6 hectare urban park located in Aleppo, Syria. With its rectangular shape the park is located in the al-Sabil district on King Faisal Street.

== History ==
The park was opened in 1895, under the Ottoman ruler of Aleppo, wāli Raif Pasha. It was named after a water-drinking fountain called Sabil ad-darawish (in Arabic: سبيل الدراويش), located on the area where the park was founded.

The park was entirely renovated and reopened on 24 February 1947 by the efforts of the governor emir Mustafa al-Shihabi.

In May 2007, new dancing water fountains were installed at the centre of the park.
