= Ar-Rahman Mosque, Aleppo =

Mosque in Aleppo, Syria

Ar-Rahman mosque
- جَامِع ٱلرَّحْمَٰن
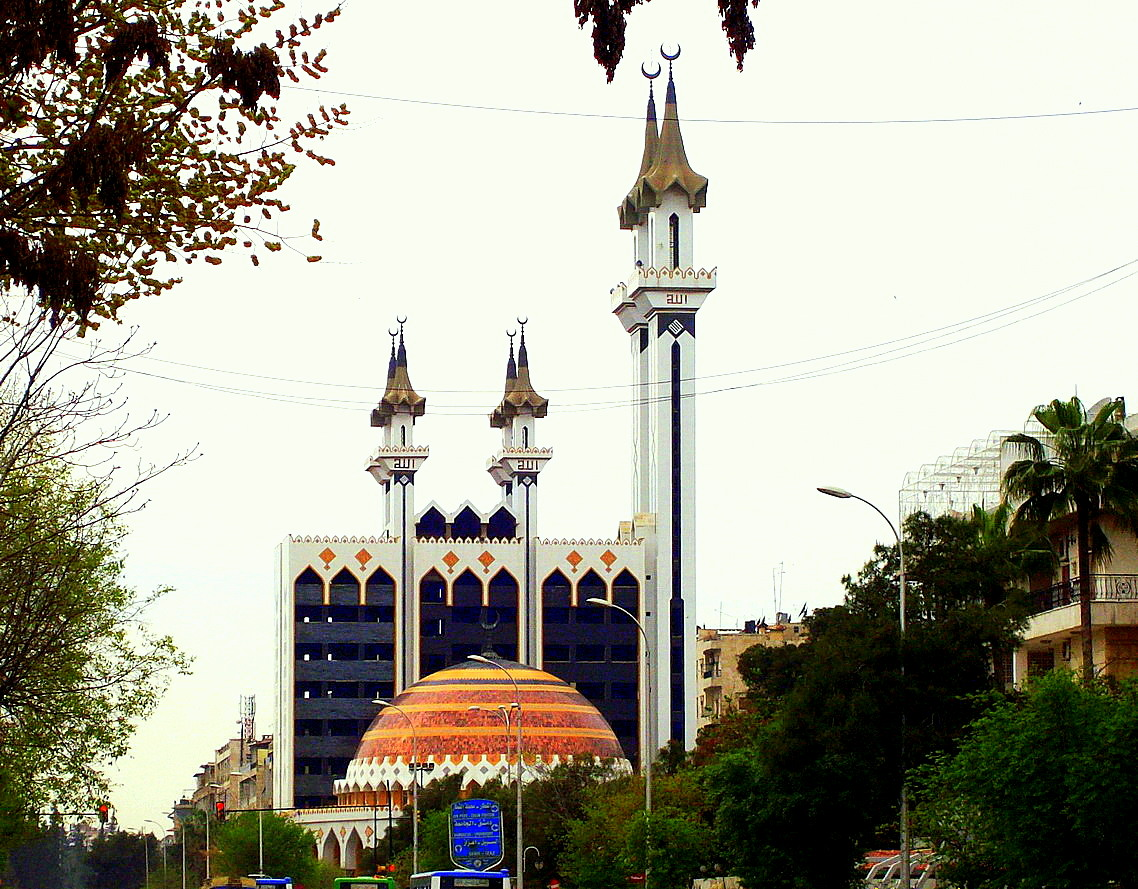
- The mosque in 2010

- Location of the mosque in Aleppo

Religion
- Affiliation: Islam
- Ecclesiastical or organisational status: Mosque
- Status: Active

Location
- Location: King Faisal Street, Aleppo
- Country: Syria
- Interactive map of Ar-Rahman mosque
- Coordinates: 36°12′59″N 37°08′18″E

Architecture
- Type: Islamic architecture
- Style: Early Umayyad; Modern
- Completed: 1994 CE

Specifications
- Dome: 1
- Minaret: 6
- Minaret height: 75 m (246 ft) (tallest two)

The Ar-Rahman Mosque (Arabic: جَامِع ٱلرَّحْمَٰن, romanized: al-Jāmiʿ ar-Raḥmān) is a contemporary mosque in Aleppo, Syria, located on King Faisal Street. It was opened in 1994 and features a combined architectural style of the early Umayyad and modern eras.

It has a large central highly-decorated dome surrounded with two 75-metre-high (246 ft) and four shorter rectangular minarets. The external walls of the mosque are decorated with stones in the form of traditional Quran pages, inscribed with some verses from the Ar-Rahman sura.

== Gallery ==
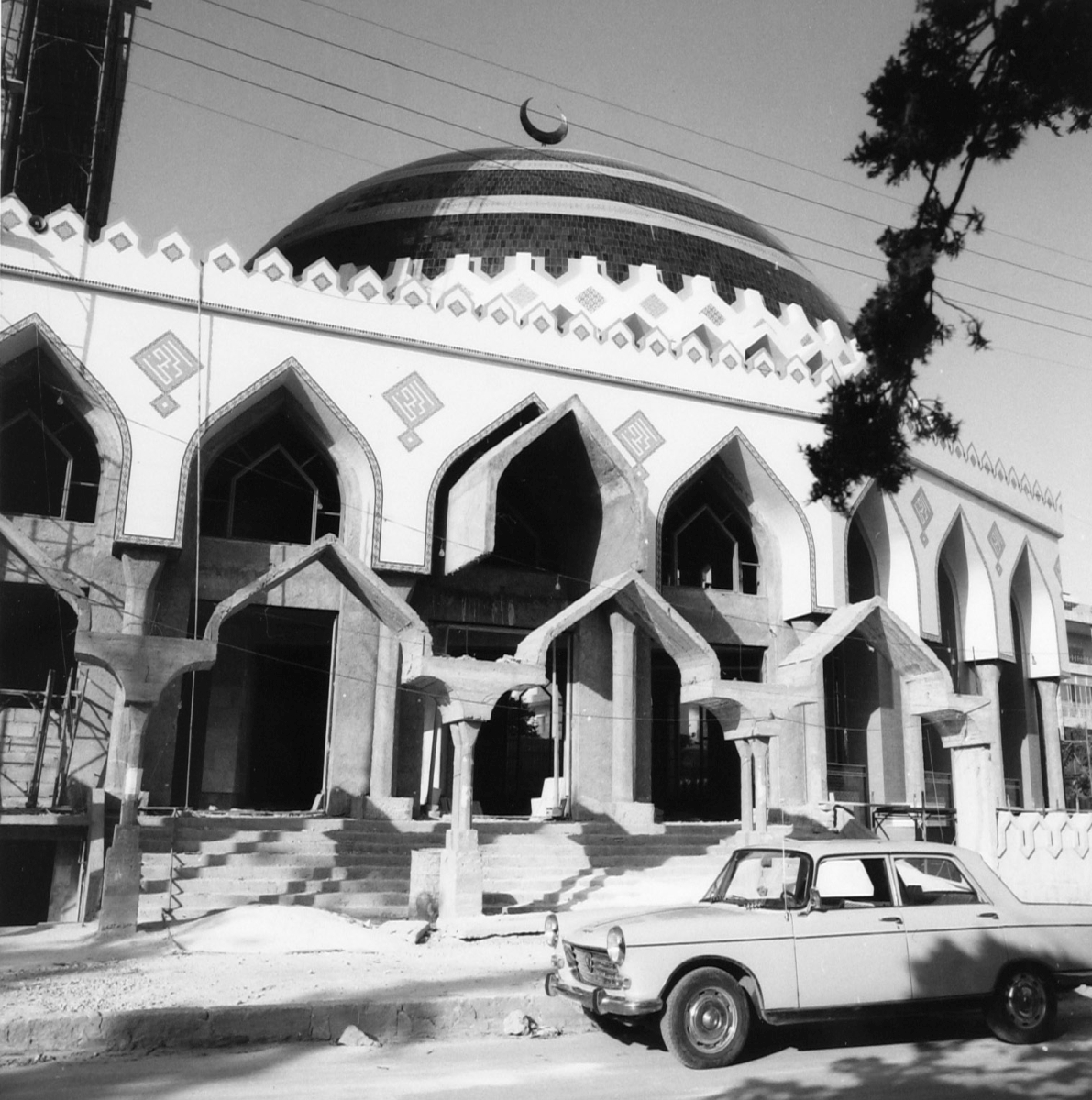
The mosque under construction in 1983, Henk van Rinsum, Nationaal Museum van Wereldculturen

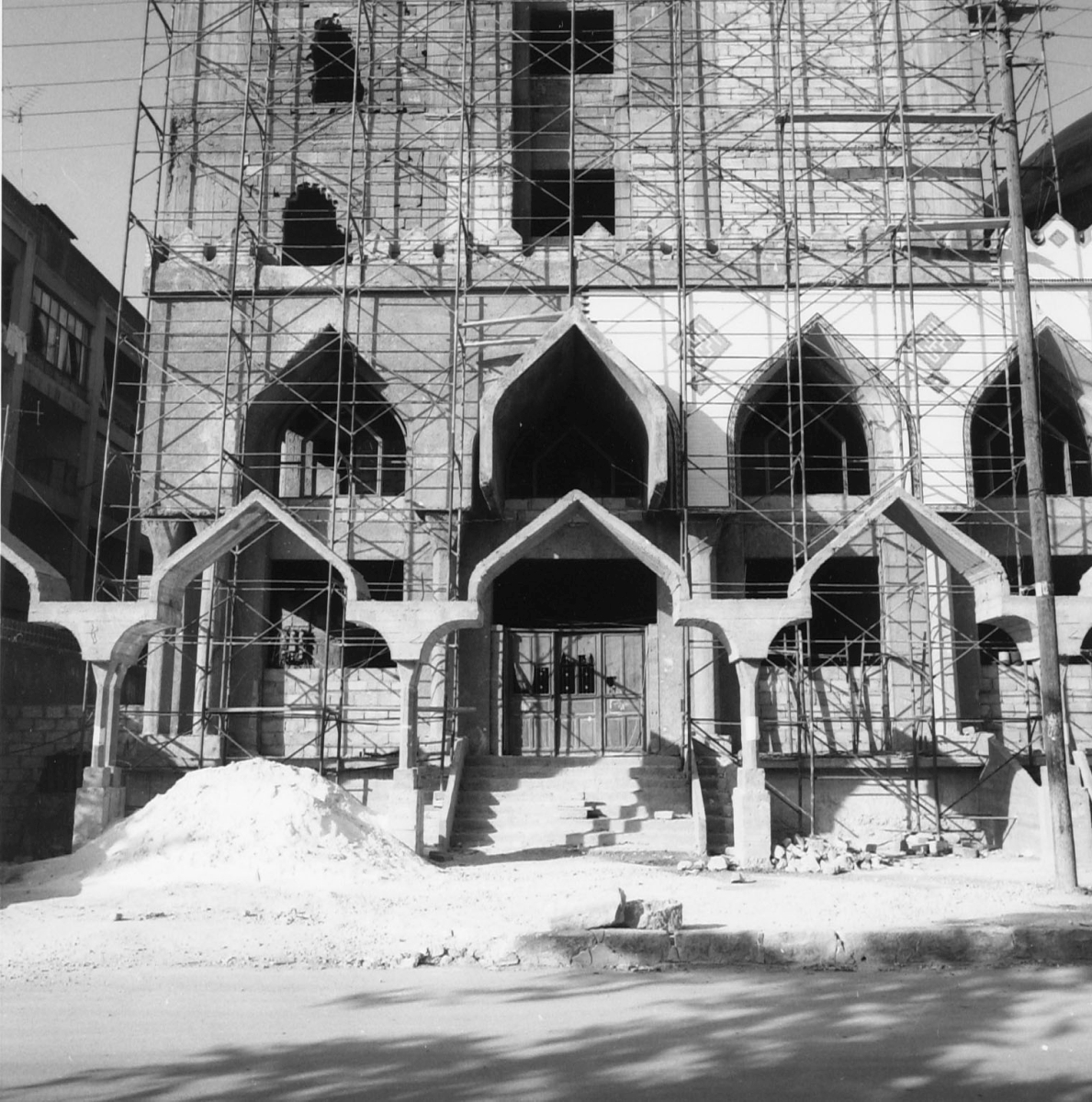
Under construction in 1983

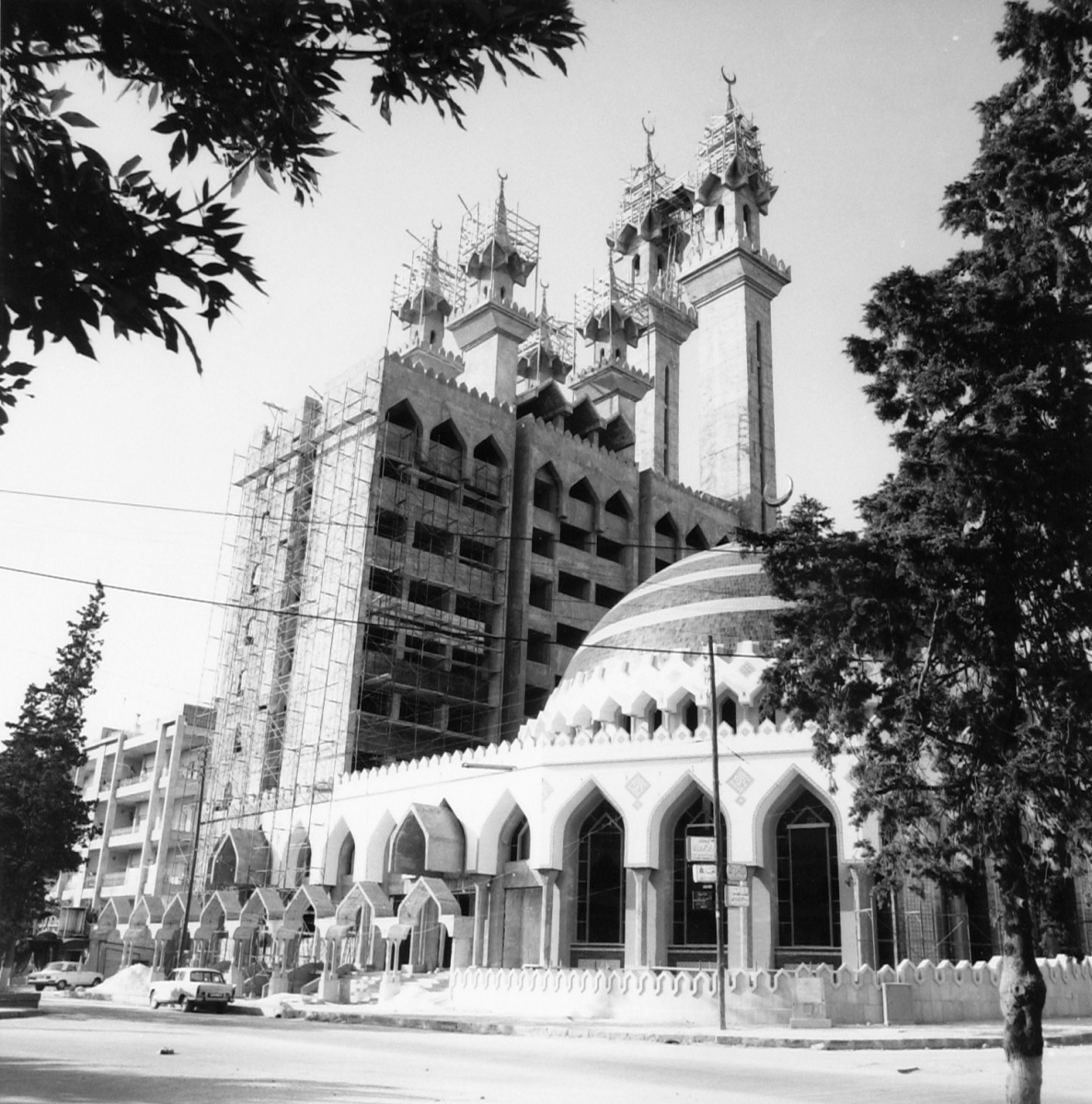
Under construction in 1983

== See also ==
- Islam in Syria
- List of mosques in Aleppo
- List of mosques in Syria
