= National Library of Aleppo =

Library in Aleppo, Syria

Coordinates: 36°12′13″N 37°09′10″E

National Library of Aleppo دار الكتب الوطنية
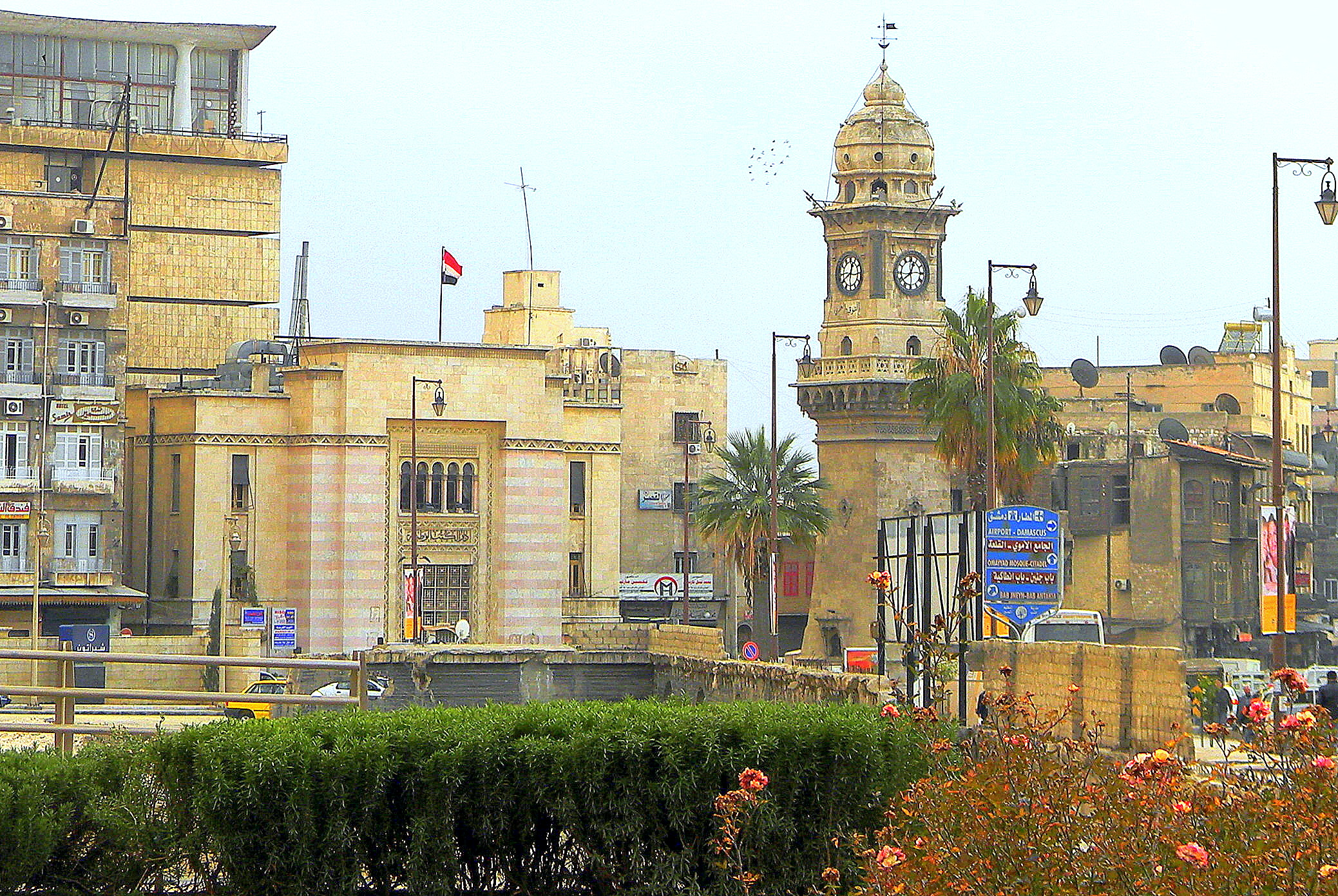
- The National Library (left) and Bab al-Faraj Clock Tower (right)
- Location: Aleppo, Syria
- Type: National Library
- Established: 1924

Collection
- Size: 100,000

The National Library of Aleppo (Arabic: دار الكتب الوطنية) is a Syrian national library in the northern city of Aleppo. It was opened in 1924, at the Islamic awqaf department in Khan al-Jumrok at the time of the French Mandate.

== History ==
In 1924, a decision to open a national library in Aleppo was passed by the central government in Damascus to become a branch of the Arab Scientific Academy. Sheikh Kamel al-Ghazzi became the first director of the library.

In 1937, the construction of the new library building was set in the Bab al-Faraj square, adjacent to the famous clock tower. The construction was completed in 1939. The inauguration of the new library building was delayed due to the circumstances during World War II. Finally, on 4 December 1945, the new building was opened by the efforts of the Aleppo governor prince Mustafa al-Shihabi, with a collection of 6,000 books.

The library remained under the administration of the Aleppo municipality until 1954 when the building was redeveloped and became under the direct administration of the Syrian Ministry of Culture.

Currently, the library contains a collection of 100,000 books. The building has a small theatre hall with 300 seats.

== See also ==
- Music of Syria
- Aleppo Centre for Culture and Arts
- Bab al-Faraj Clock Tower
