= Abd al-Rahman Mowakket =

Abdul Rahman Mowakket (born 1946) is a contemporary sculptor from Syria.

Abdul Rahman's career as a sculptor spans more than 40 years. He has been fully devoted to artistic work since 1976. He has a private workshop.

== Background ==
He was born in 1946 in Aleppo city. He studied there and graduated with a "good" degree from the Teachers' postgraduate institute. In 1960 he started practicing fine arts, drawing, and sculpture. In 1965 he started his studies of Fine Arts by personal study through a big collection of Fine Art techniques and sciences literature. In 1970 he started his actual artistic activities on the country level with a series of personal, group, and official exhibitions. In 1976 he devoted himself to the Fine Arts by practicing it in his own atelier (workshop) and he began to teach Sculpture in the Fine Arts Centre in Aleppo. In 1980 he went to Italy and studied nude sculpture at the Rome Academy of Fine Art. In Rome, he was introduced to the artistic movement in Rome and to the most important works of art in the squares and the museums of Italy. Also, he exhibited his work in an exhibition in Rome. In 1982 he returned to Syria and began to execute a large number of sculpture works and started to prepare a good number of studies of monumental statues in the favour of many local squares. In 1984 he began to execute a large number of monumental statues in the squares of the city of Aleppo, which he continues to this day. He also presented many statues which have been presented in personal and group exhibitions. He moved to Turkey in 2014 where he shifted his artwork to painting and he had three exhibitions in Mersin, Tarsus and Adana between 2015 and 2016. He died in Gaziantep in Turkey on the 5th of May 2023 and was buried there.

== Monumental works ==
1. Memorial of Martyrs: Aleppo Saadallah al-Jabiri Square
  1984-1985 Aleppo yellow stone (Stone Epic)
2. Memorial monumental Al Majed Fighting Base
  1986-1987 Italian Marble (100 Tons of Italian Marble)
3. Memorial Monumental – Aleppo
  1995-1997 Made out of Bronze (Total 10 Tons of Bronze)
4. The study Memorial Monumental wall
  1998-1999 Aleppo – 75 Square Meters of Gibson
5. Commencing the execution of the monumental wall
  2002-2003 Aleppo (25 Cubic Meters of Italian Marble)
6. Study and executing work on Aleppo Int. Airport and the water artistic wall
  2001-2002 made of small pieces of coloured ceramic in total of 300 Square Meters of space
7. Designing and executing the Memorial Monumental of Aleppo International Airport
  2003-2004 Made of Bronze, Height 8.50 Meters Weight 5.2 Tons

== Personal exhibitions ==
- 1971 First Expo National Museum of Aleppo
- 1976 Stone and marble Statues Damascus – Al Shaab Gallery
- 1979 Big Stone Statues expo – Aleppo Al Sabil public garden
- 1979 Exhibiting 6 huge statues of stone – Damascus National Museum garden
- 1980 Collection of small bronze statues – Damascus Al Shaab Gallery
- 1981 Collection of small bronze statues – Rome Potico di Guadri Gallery
- 1989 Marble Statues – Aleppo Bilad Al Sham Gallery
- 1990 Marble statues – Damascus Bilad Al Sham Gallery
- 1992 Marble statues – Damascus Al Sayid Gallery
- 1994 Bronze statues – Aleppo Bilad Al Sham Gallery
- 2006 Marble Statues - Green Art Gallery, Dubai, UAE
- 2016 Oil and Acrylic paintings exhibition, Adana, Turkey

== Distribution ==
His work is distributed in:

- Damascus:
  - Presidential Palace
  - National Museum Damascus (Modern Art Hall)
  - National Leadership Building's garden
  - Ministry of Culture and its museums
  - Within collections of Syrian fine art fans
- Aleppo:
  - National Museum
  - Presidential Palace
  - Public squares and gardens
  - Touristic places
  - A number of government establishments and places
  - Within the collections of Aleppo Fine Art fans

A large number of statues have been distributed in Lebanon, Germany, France, Spain, Italy, and elsewhere.

== Activities ==
He managed the artistic symposium in Aleppo which involved more than 100 artists.

He is a member of the Fine Arts Council and the Arab Fin Artists Union.

== Awards ==
He won many trophies in monumental competitions in Syria. He won a Sculpture trophy (Golden Medal) in AL Mahabbah biennale Lattakia in 1999. He won a number of certifications from the Minister's Chamber, Ministry of Culture, and a number of artistic establishments.

He was honoured by the Ministry of Culture at the 2002 Al Mahabbah Festival due to the part he played in the artistic movement and for the works he executed.
