= Bab al-Faraj Clock Tower =

Clock tower in Aleppo, Syria

Coordinates: 36°12′14″N 37°09′10″E

- برج ساعة باب الفرج
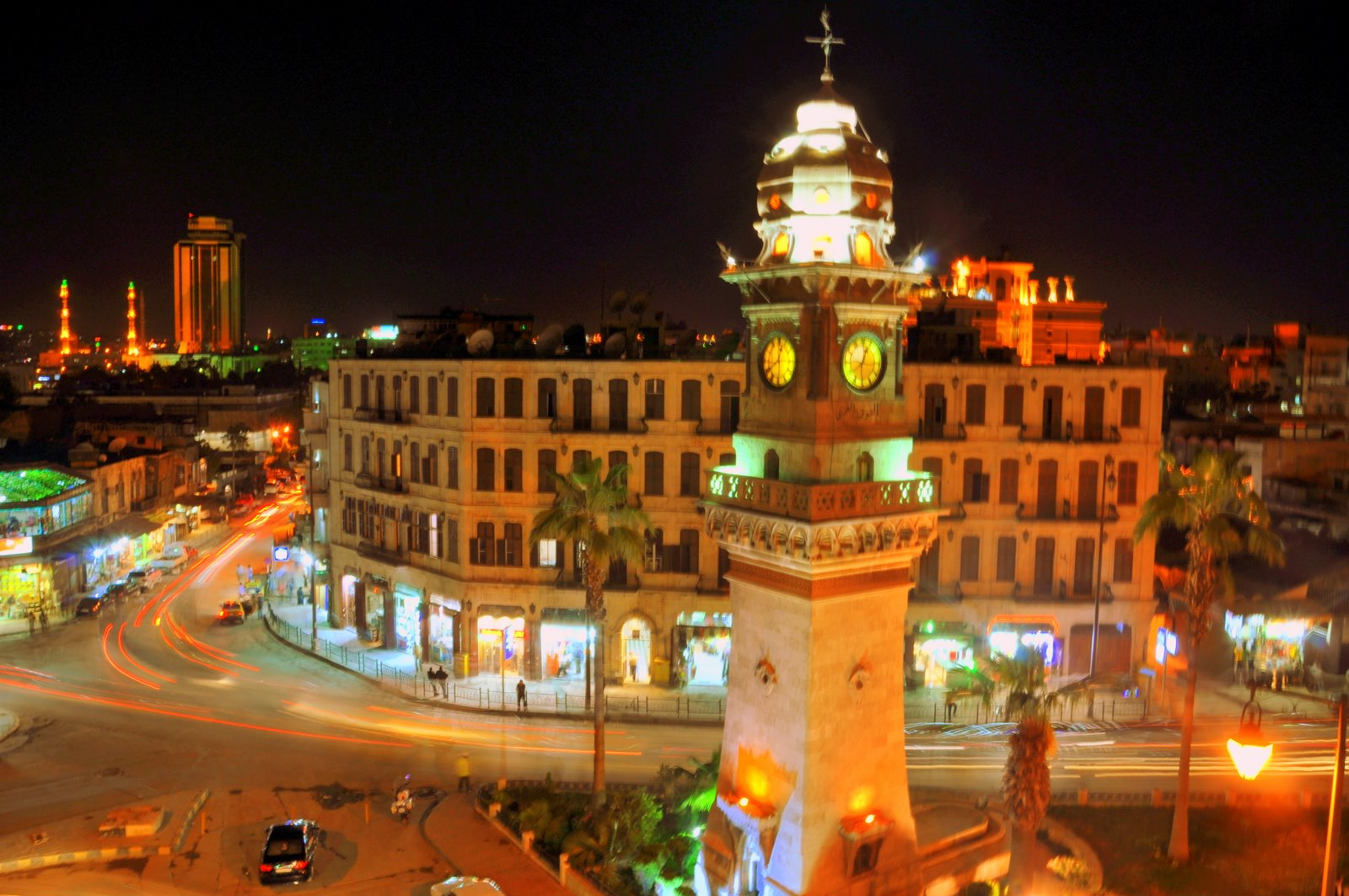
- Bab al-Faraj Clock Tower
- Interactive map of the Bab al-Faraj Clock Tower area
- Alternative names: Bab al-Faradis

General information
- Type: Clock tower
- Architectural style: Islamic, Mamluk
- Location: Aleppo, Syria
- Construction started: 1898; 128 years ago
- Completed: 1899; 127 years ago

Height
- Height: 28 metres (92 ft)

Design and construction
- Architect: Charles Chartier
- Engineer: Bakr Sidqi

Bab al-Faraj Clock Tower (Arabic: برج ساعة باب الفرج) is one of the main landmarks of Aleppo, Syria. It was built in 1898-1899 by the French architect of Aleppo city Charles Chartier with the help of the Syrian engineer Bakr Sidqi, under the Ottoman ruler of Aleppo; wāli Raif Pasha.

It is located near the historical gate of Bab al-Faraj, adjacent to the building of the National library. Its construction was encouraged by Sultan Abdul Hamid II in order to mark the modern era of timeliness.

The tower was inaugurated in 1900 on the occasion of the 25th anniversary of the Sultan's accession to the throne.

The construction of the tower cost a sum of 1,500 Ottoman lira. Half of the cost was collected through donations while the other half was paid by the municipality.

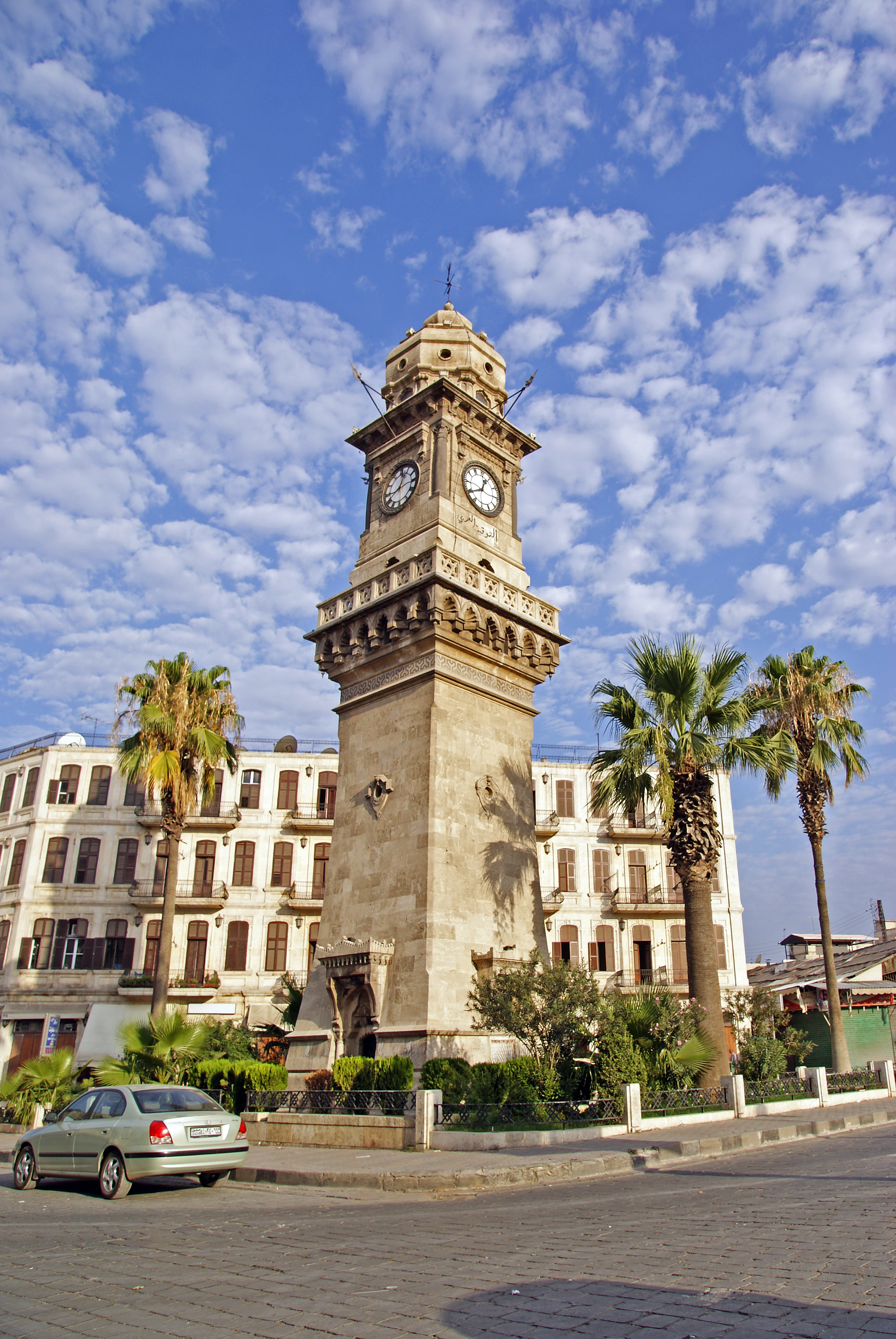
Bab al-Faraj Clock Tower in 2009

The design of the tower resembles the old Islamic minarets with four similar façades, topped with traditional oriental muqarnas.

== See also ==
- Aleppo
- Bab al-Faraj (Aleppo)
- National Library of Aleppo
