= Bab al-Faraj (Aleppo) =

- بَاب الْفَرَج
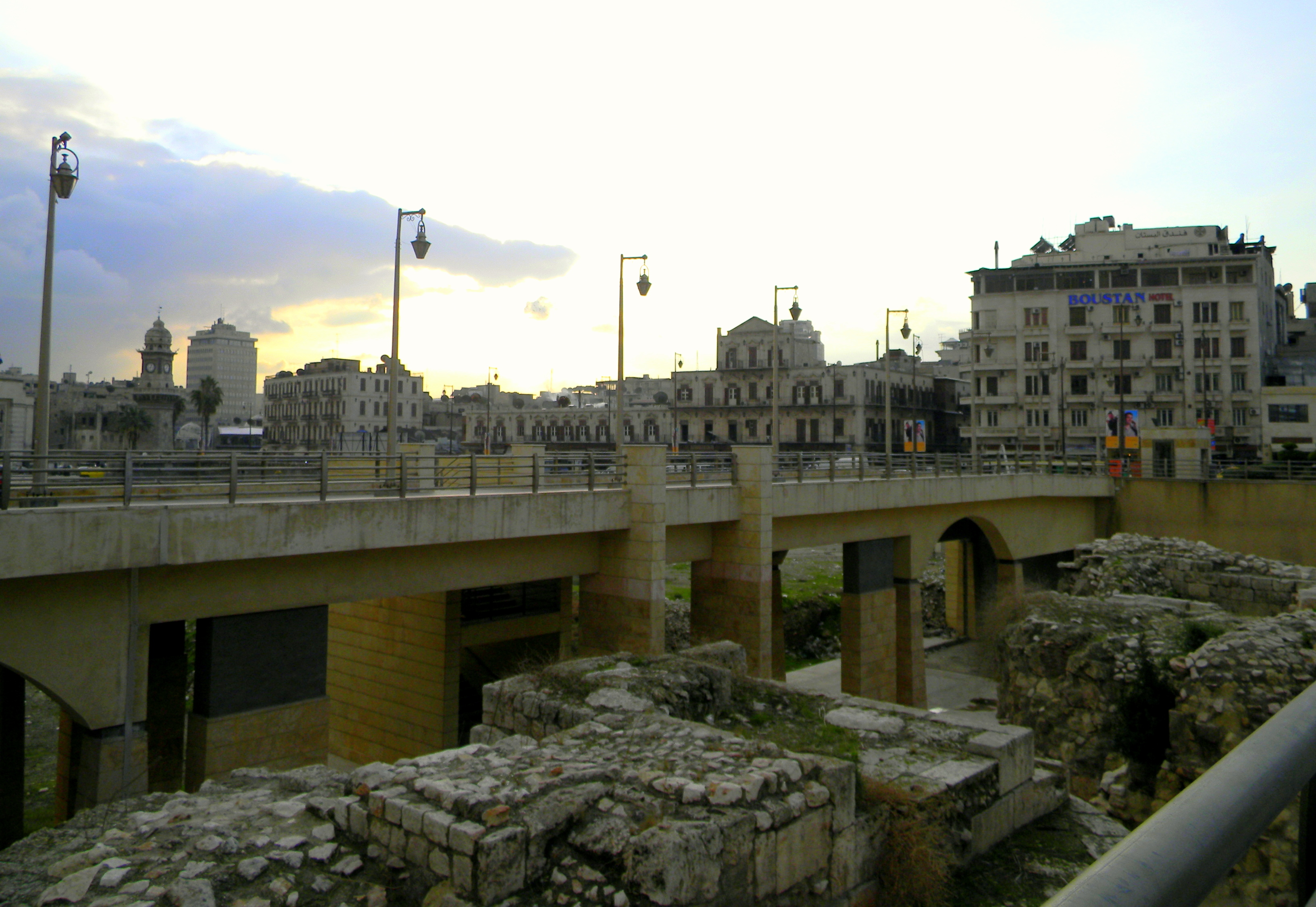
- The ruins of the gate in 2011
- Alternative names: Bab al-Faradis

General information
- Status: ruined
- Type: City gate
- Architectural style: Islamic architecture
- Town or city: Aleppo
- Country: Syria
- Coordinates: 36°12′14″N 37°9′9″E
- Completed: between 1193 and 1216
- Renovated: between 1236 and 1260
- Destroyed: 1904
- Known for: One of the 9 main gates of the ancient city walls of Aleppo

Bab al-Faraj (Arabic: بَاب الْفَرَج, romanized: Bāb al-Faraj or Bāb al-Faraǧ), meaning the Gate of Deliverance or Bab al-Faradis was one of the nine main gates of the ancient city walls of Aleppo, Syria. It was located at the northern side of the ancient city. The gate was ruined in 1904. Some remains are still found at the north-eastern part of the gate.

== History ==
Bab al-Faraj was built by Az-Zahir Ghazi and later renovated by An-Nasir Yusuf. The Bab al-Faraj Clock Tower is one of the main landmarks of Aleppo. The tower was built in 1898-1899 by the French architect of Aleppo city Charles Chartier.

== Gallery ==
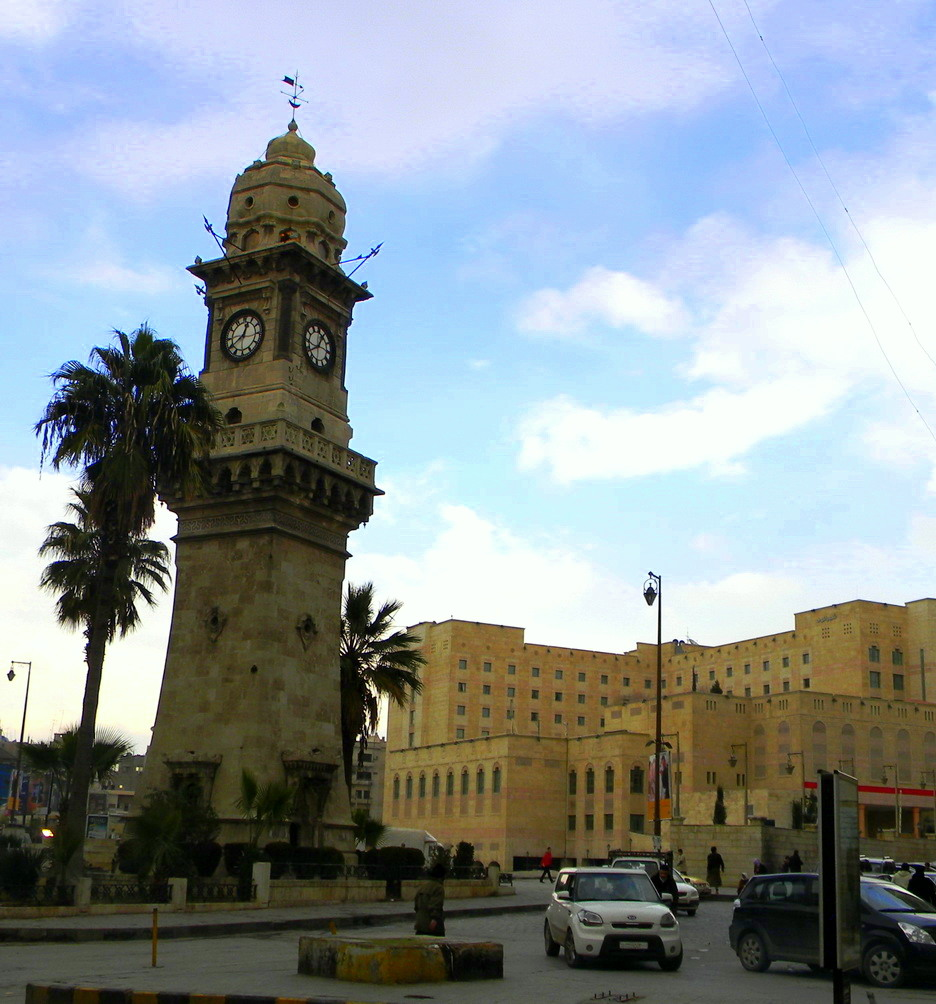
Bab al-Faraj Clock Tower

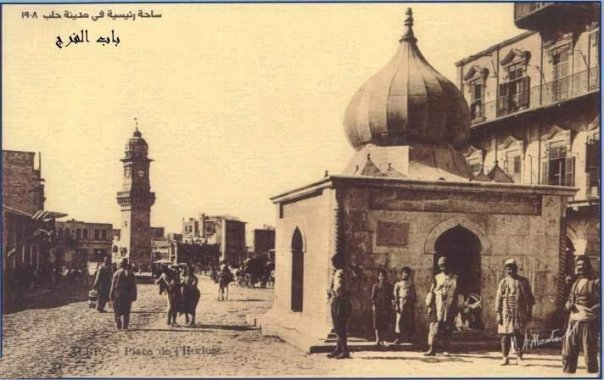
Bab al-Faraj in 1908

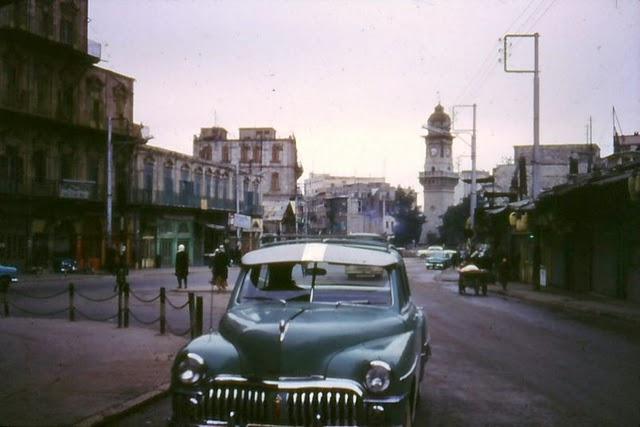
Bab al-Faraj in 1961

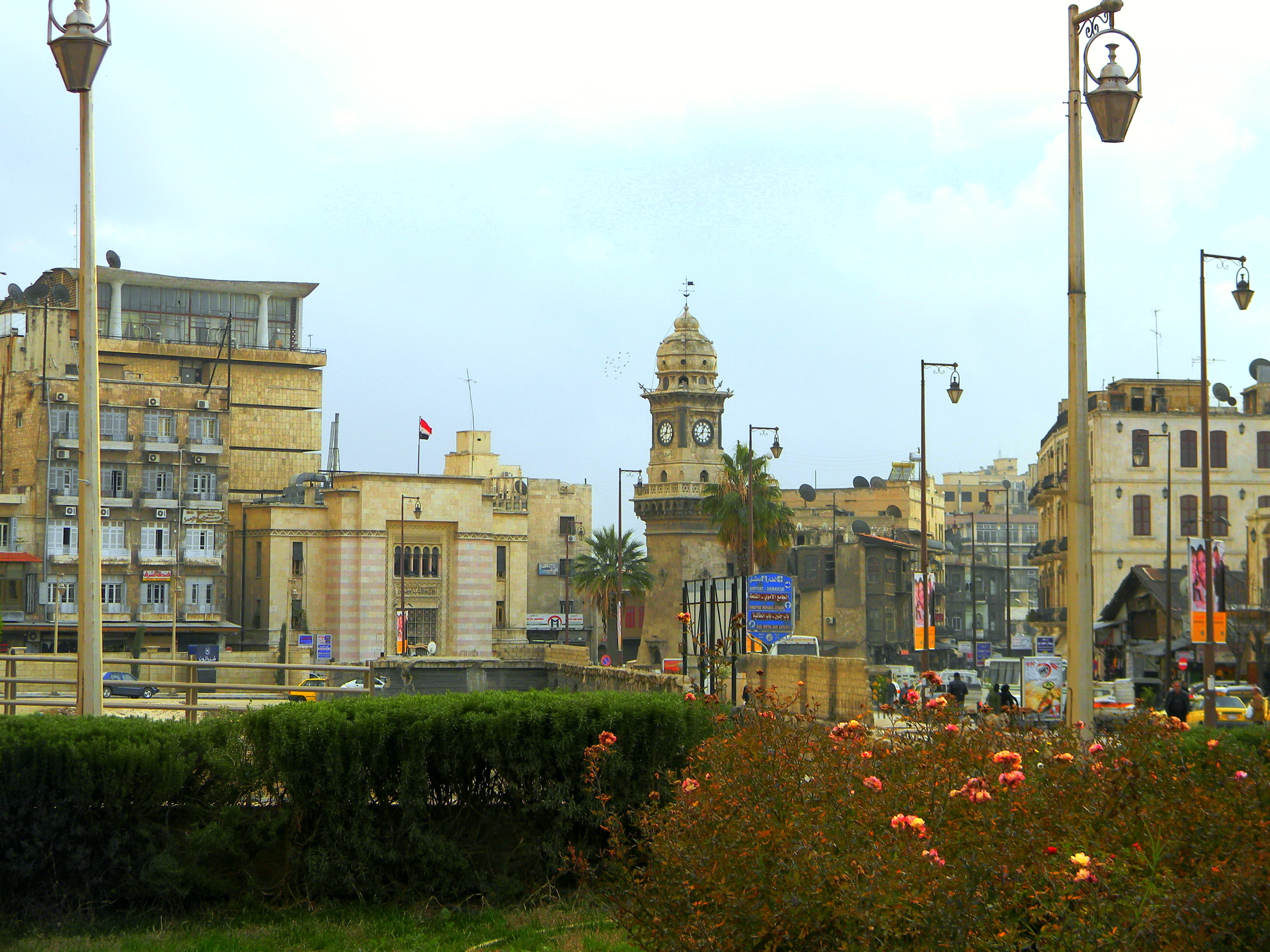
Bab al-Faraj in 2011
