= Aleppo Public Park =

Park in Aleppo, Syria

Public Park of Aleppo Alhadika Al-Amma الحديقة العامة بحلب
- The entrance
- Interactive map of Public Park of Aleppo; Alhadika Al-Amma الحديقة العامة بحلب
- Type: Municipal
- Location: Gare de Baghdad district, Aleppo
- Coordinates: 36°12′35″N 37°08′50″E
- Area: 17 hectares (42 acres)
- Created: 1949
- Operator: Aleppo city council
- Status: Open all year from 6 AM to 12 AM

Aleppo Public Park (Arabic: الحديقة العامة بحلب) is a 17-hectare urban park located in Aleppo, Syria. With its hexagonal shape, the park is located in Gare de Baghdad district covering an area between Jamiliyeh and Aziziyeh districts. It is bordered by "Majd Al-Deen Al-Jabiri" street from the east, "Kamel Al-Ghazzi" street from the west, and Saadallah Al-Jabiri Square from the south. Queiq River intersected the park.

It was founded in 1949 as a result of the efforts of the local community and city authorities.

The park is home to many artworks of famous Syrian sculptors. The statue of emir Sayf al-Dawla is located at the main entrance while the statue of poet Khalil al-Hindawi is near the central fountains.

In October 2006, new dancing water fountains were installed at the park's centre.

== Gallery ==
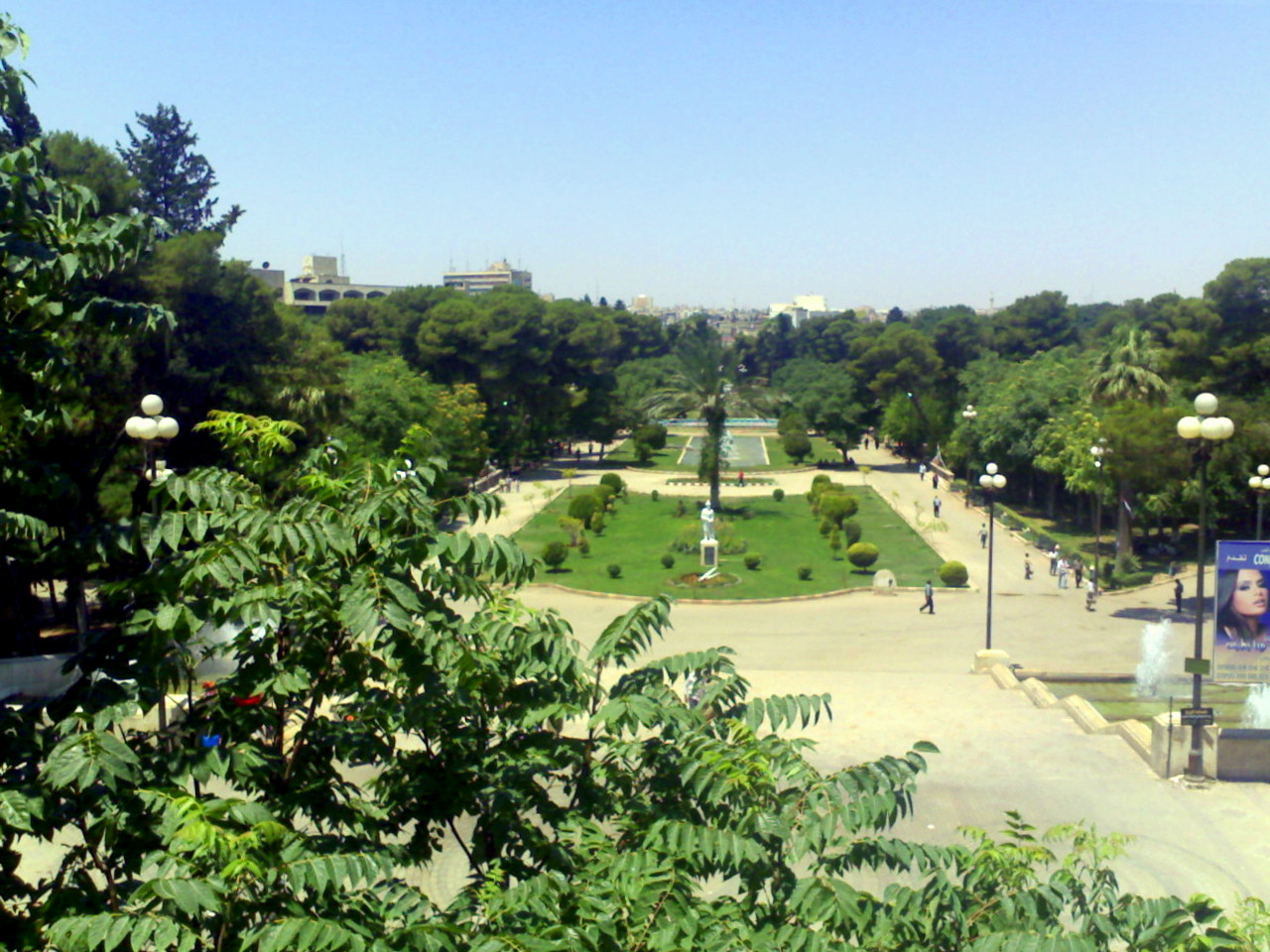
The park in 2007, general view

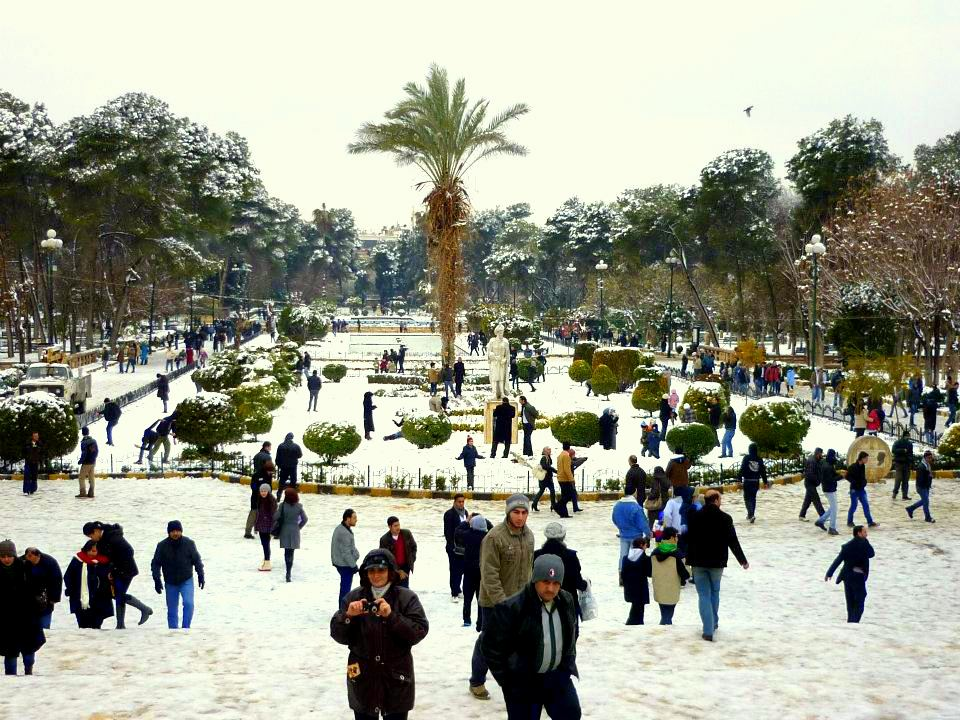
The park in 2012

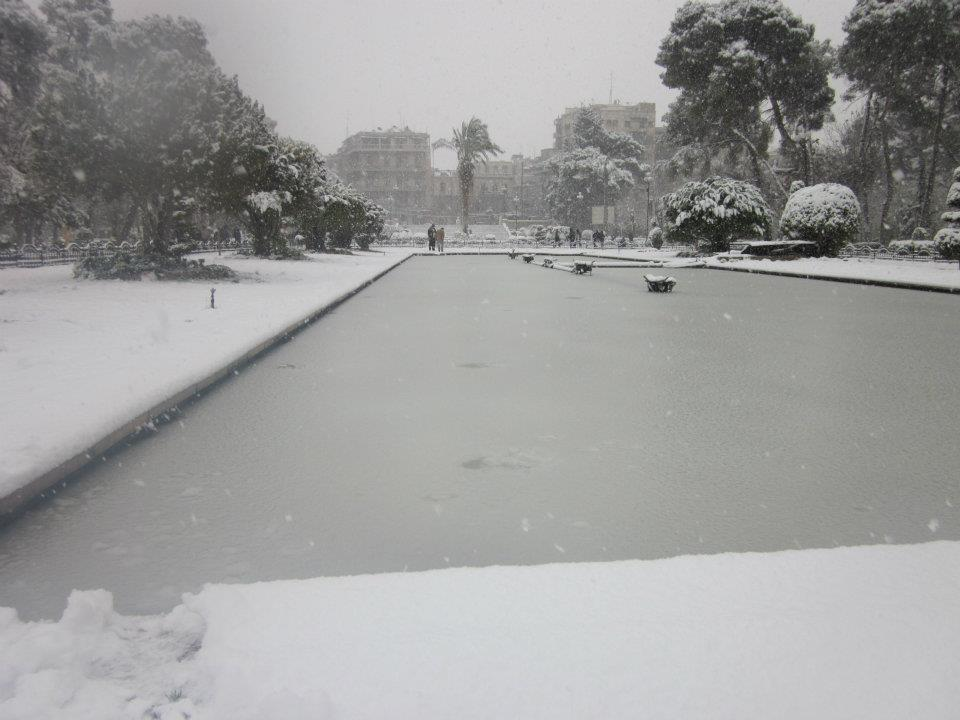
The park during winter

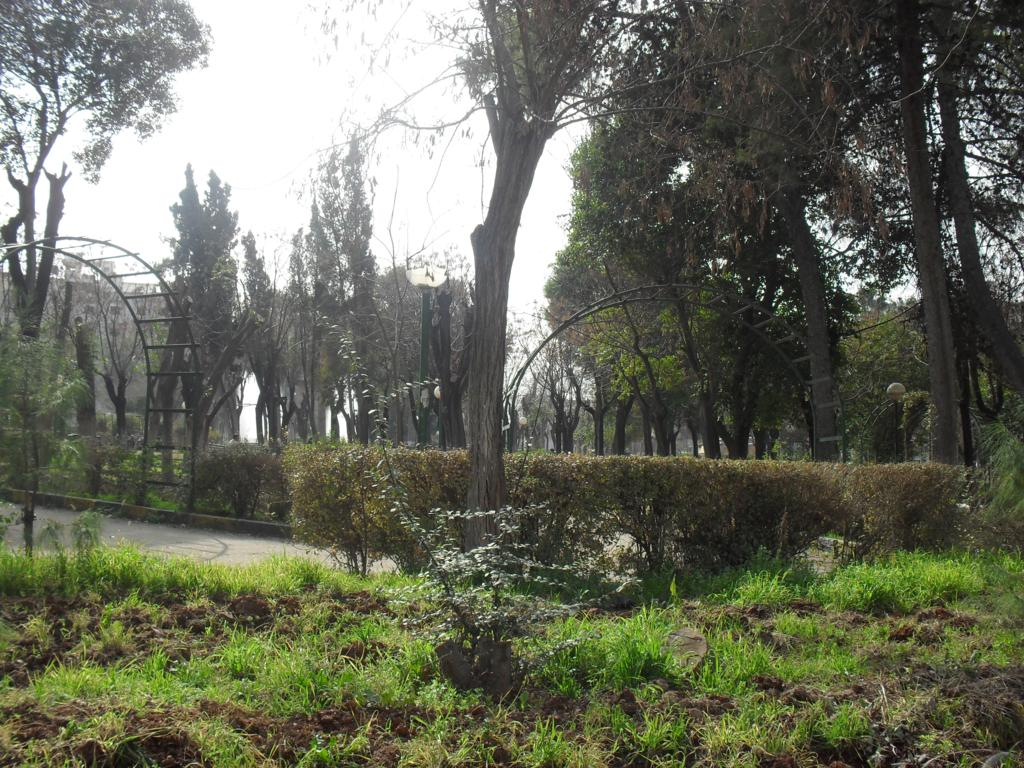
View from the park

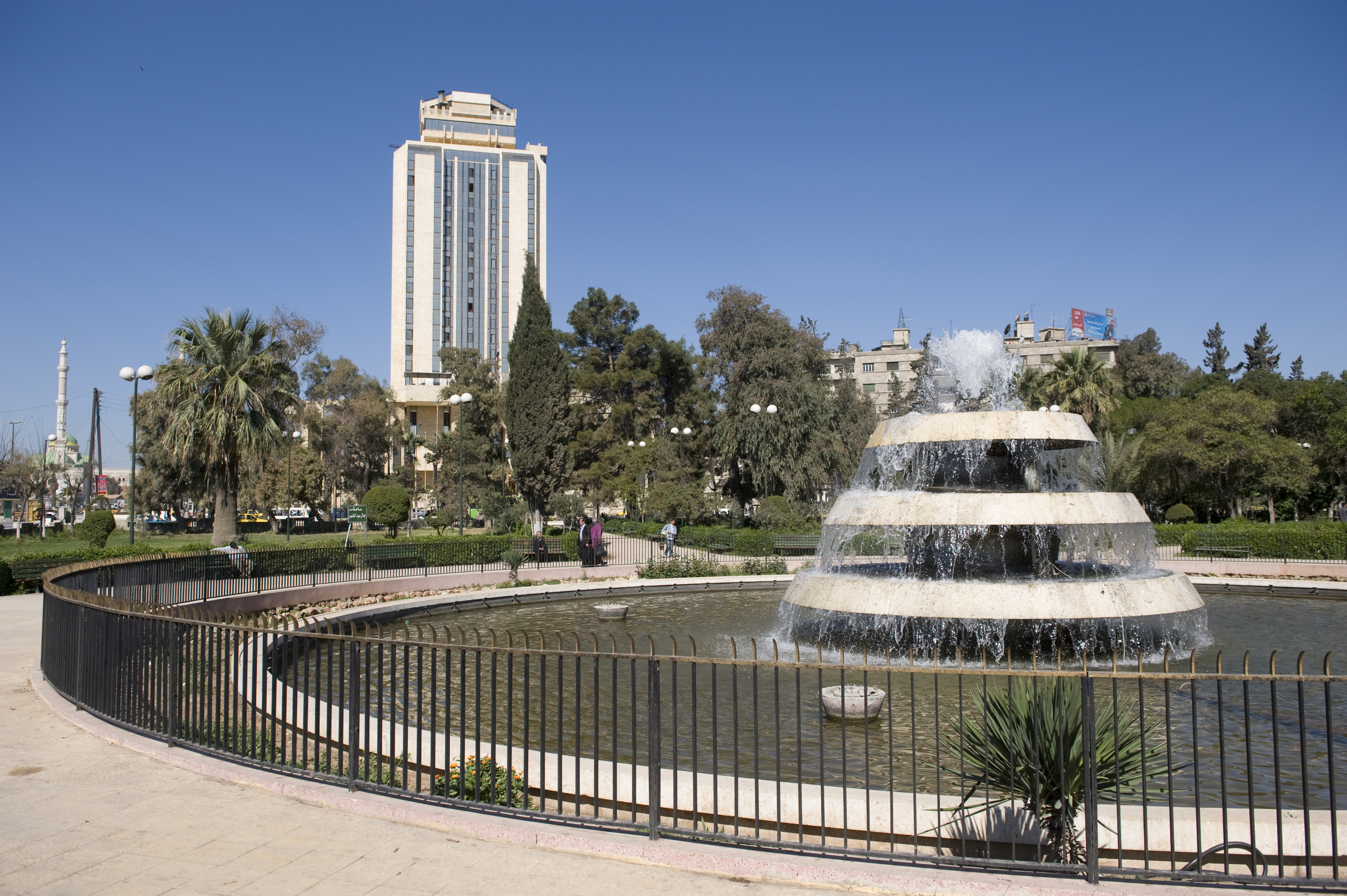
Dancing water fountain at the end of the park
