= Saadallah al-Jabiri Square =

Square in Aleppo, Syria

- City square
- {{{other_names}}}
- ساحة سعد الله الجابري
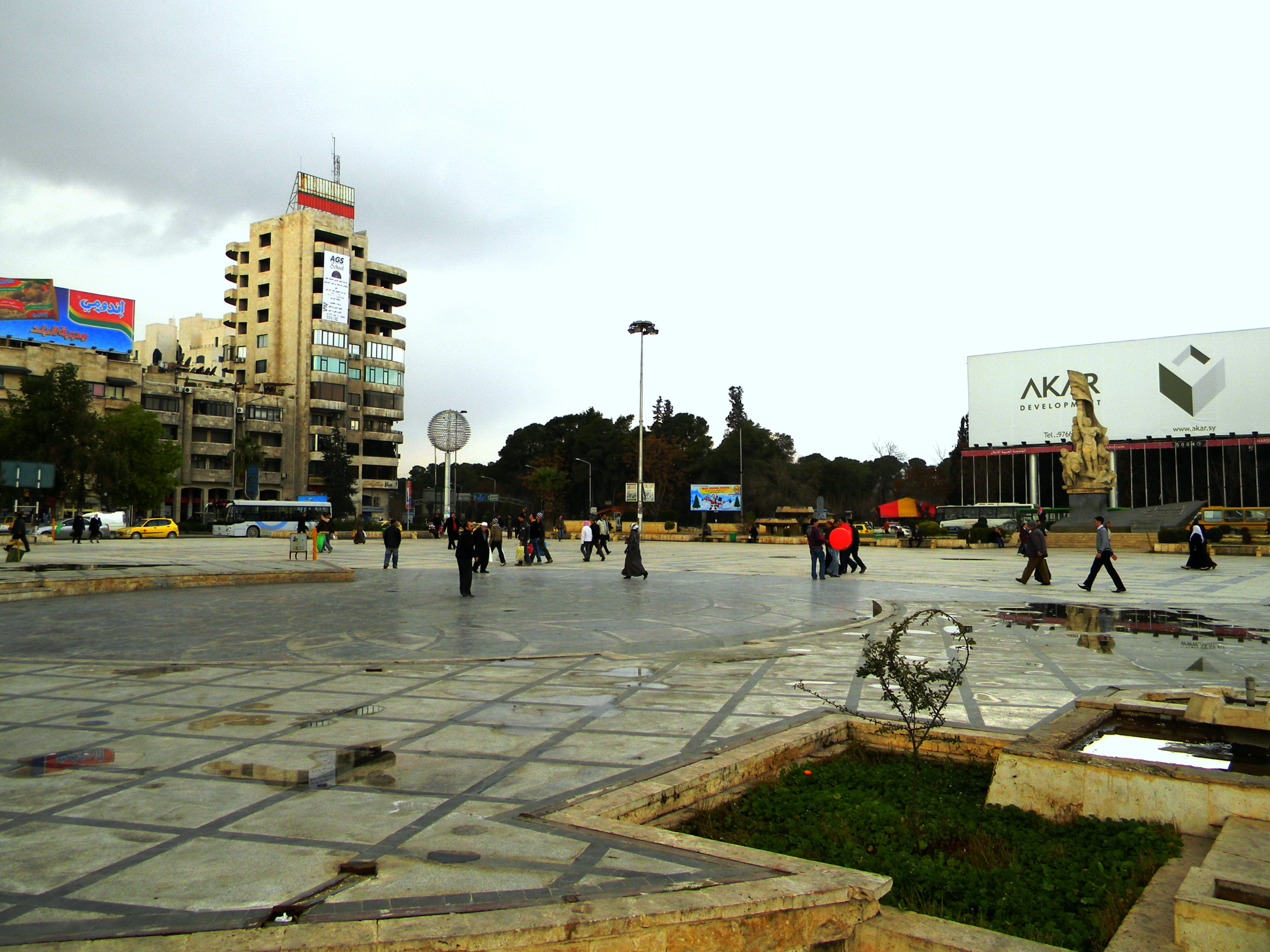
- Saadallah al-Jabiri Square in January 2011
- Opened: 1947
- Owner: City of Aleppo
- Location: Majd al-Deen al-Jabiri street, Aleppo, Syria
- Location in Aleppo
- Coordinates: 36°12′25″N 37°08′51″E

Saadallah al-Jabiri Square (Arabic: ساحة سعد الله الجابري, romanized: Sāḥat Saʿad Allāh al-Jābirī) is the central town square at the heart of the Syrian city of Aleppo. It is the most important square in the city, experiencing most of the celebrations and festivals in Aleppo. The square is named after former Syrian Prime Minister and statesman Saadallah al-Jabiri.

The square is adjacent to the Aleppo Public Park, intersected by Majd al-Deen al-Jabiri street from the east and Kamel al-Ghazzi street from the west. Parts of the stream bed of Queiq River are covered by the square and the adjacent roads and buildings.

== Monuments ==
=== Statue of Saadallah al-Jabiri ===
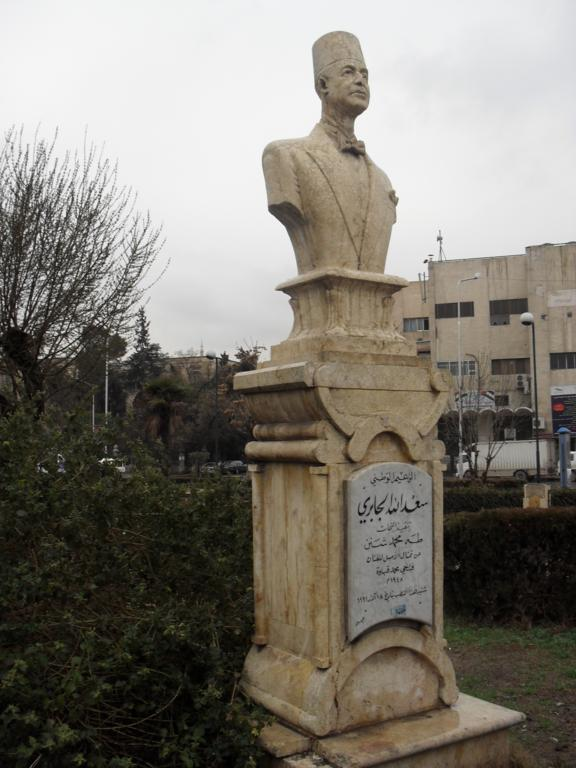
The statue of Saadallah al-Jabiri in 2011

A statue of Saadallah al-Jabiri is located on the southern side of the square, facing the plaza, with its back to a small park named in his honor.

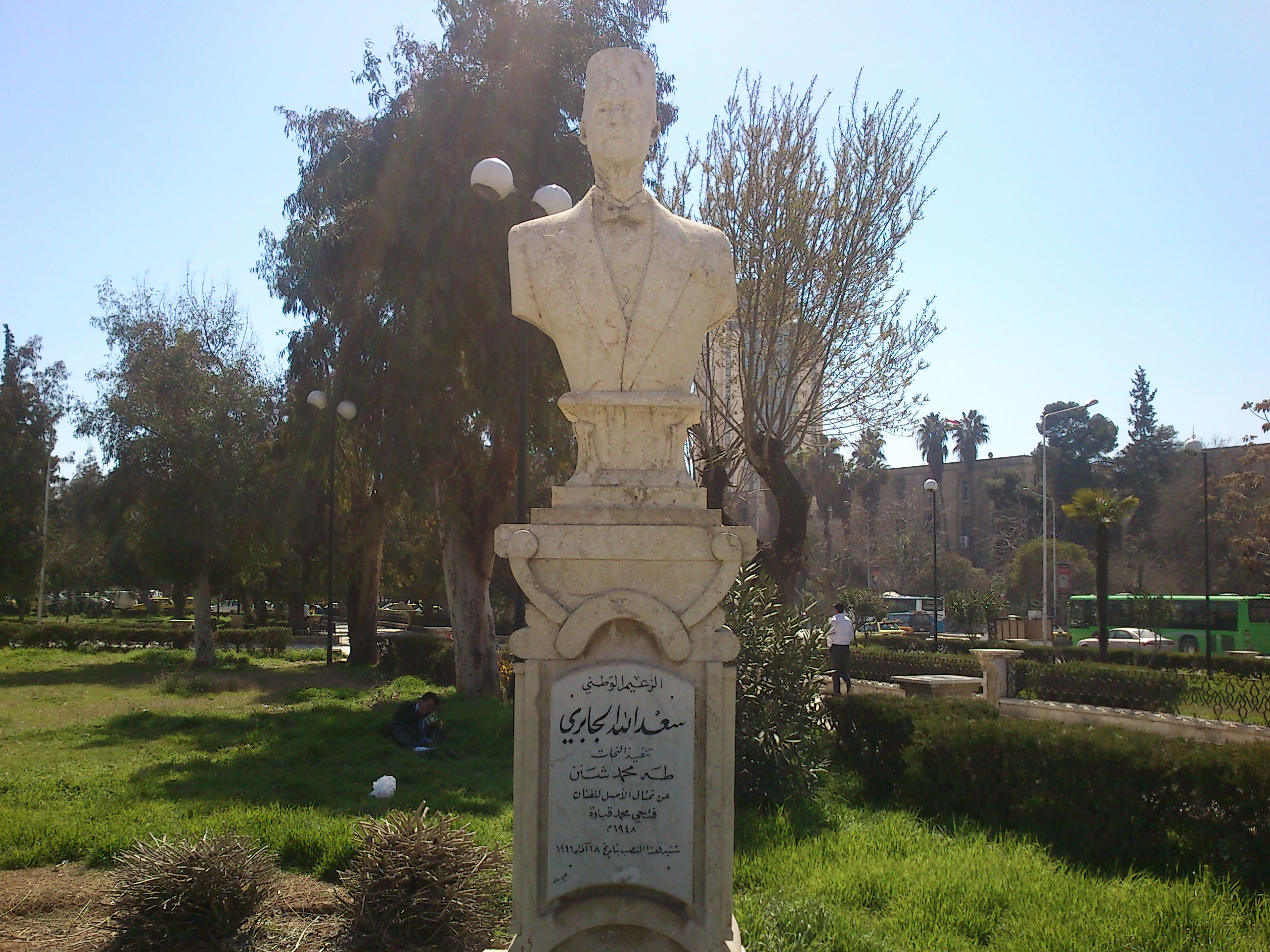
The statue of Saadallah al-Jabiri in 2012

=== Martyrs' memorial ===
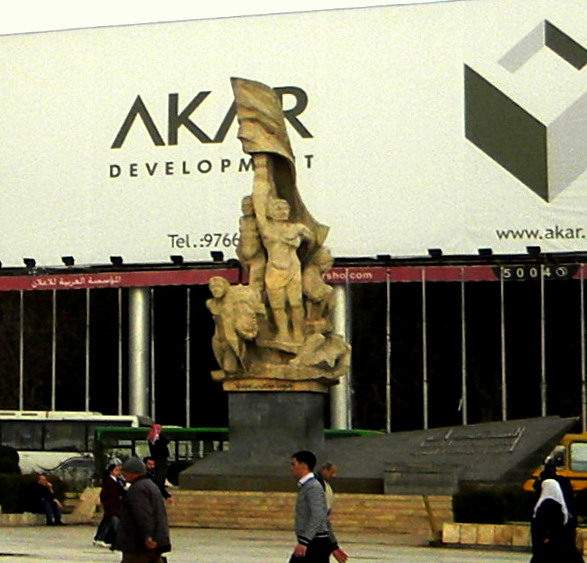
The martyrs' memorial in 2011

A monument dedicated to Syrian martyrs was erected in the northern section of the square. It was designed by Syrian sculptor Abd al-Rahman Mowakket, an Aleppo native. The monument was sculpted in the years 1984-1985 from Aleppine yellow stone.

The destruction of the monument in July 2025

The monument was damaged in July 2025 during what was officially described as a failed attempt to relocate it to clear the view for a newly installed large screen at the square. The incident sparked significant controversy, as many observers questioned the manner in which the relocation was carried out, suggesting it appeared more like an act of deliberate destruction than a logistical failure. Speculation arose that the damage may have been ideologically motivated, given that the monument includes depictions of human figures, which some interpretations of Islamic doctrine consider prohibited (haram). Critics pointed to the government's Islamist orientation as a possible motive. In response, the Governor of Aleppo, Azzam al-Gharib, issued a statement denying any ideological motivation, asserting that the damage was accidental. He explained that the original plan was to transfer the monument to the National Museum of Aleppo and assured that those responsible for the unprofessional handling of the monument would be held accountable. He also confirmed that the monument would be restored and installed at the museum as initially intended.

The monument in the parking lot of Aleppo National Museum in August 2026

=== I love Aleppo ===
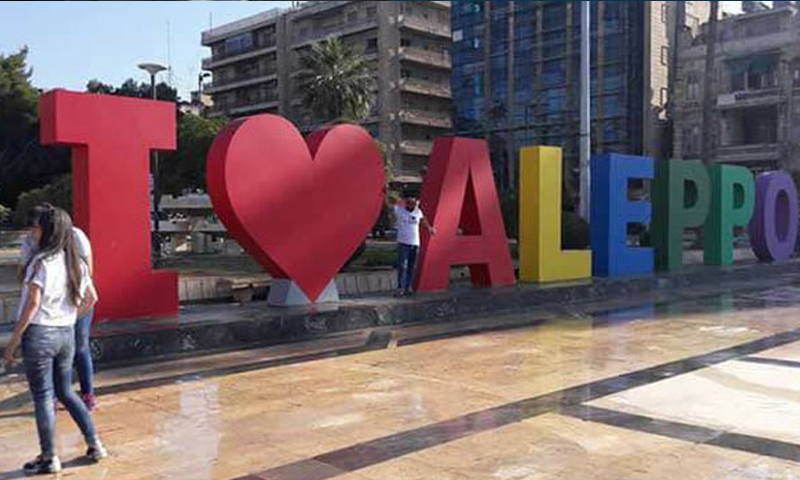
"I love Aleppo" monument in 2017

After several renovations to the square, an "I love Aleppo" monument was installed near the martyrs' memorial and later revealed on 29 September 2017. It was later relocated to the other side of the square. The monument was later repainted in the colors of the flag of the Syrian revolution after opposition factions captured the city during the 2024 Battle of Aleppo in November 2024.

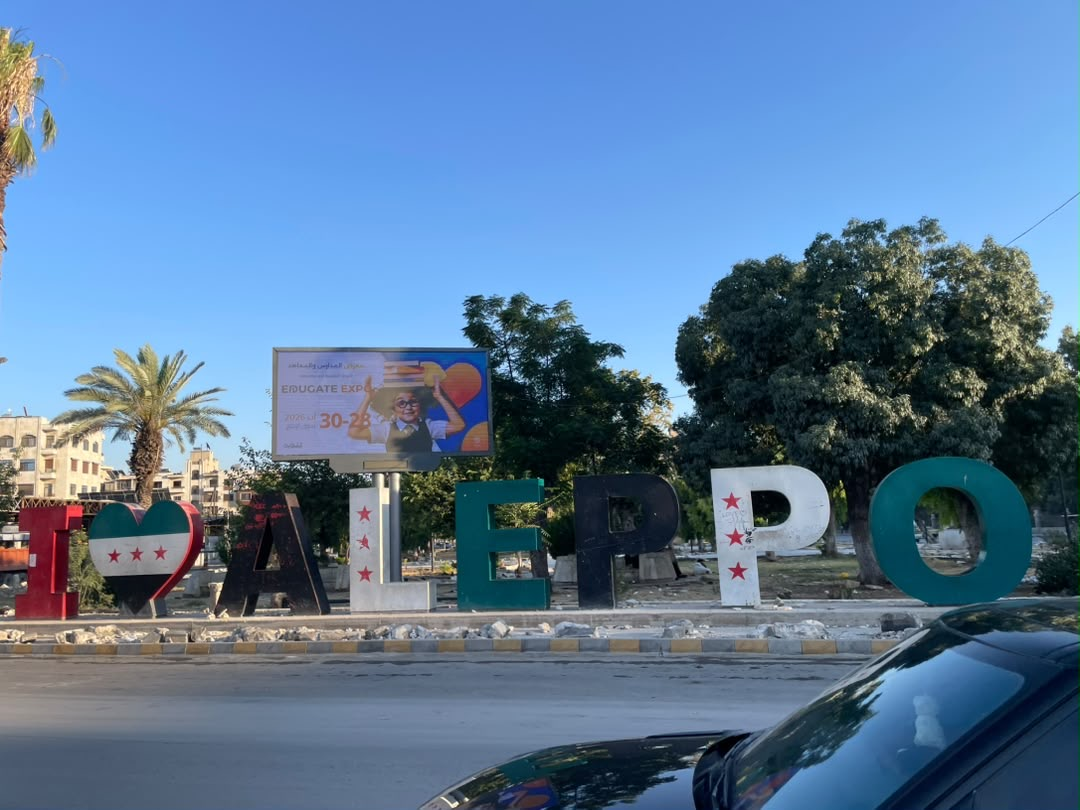
"I love Aleppo" monument in 2026

== Renovations ==
In February 2010, the Aleppo City Council announced its intention to launch a rehabilitation process in the square, which was intended to play an important role in the solution of the traffic congestion in the centre of the city.

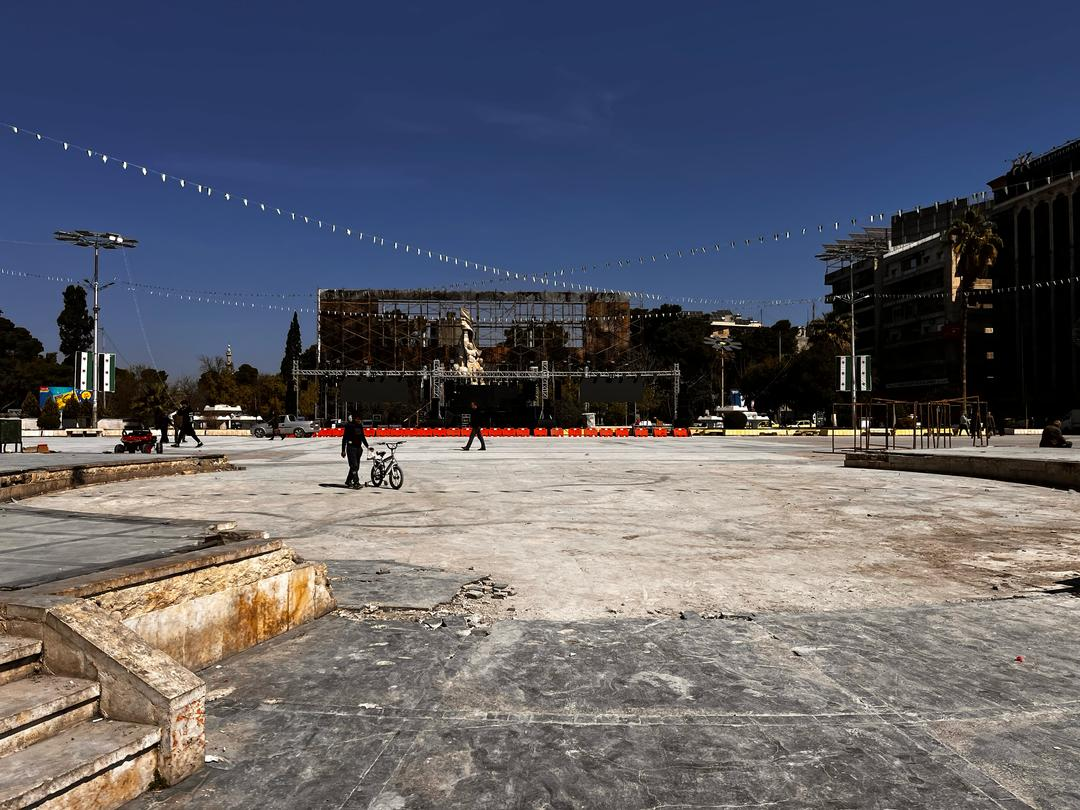
The Square undergoing renovations in March 2025

In 2025, the Aleppo Governorate announced a plan to renovate the square with a new design. An opening celebration was held on 30 June 2025.

== 2012 bombings ==
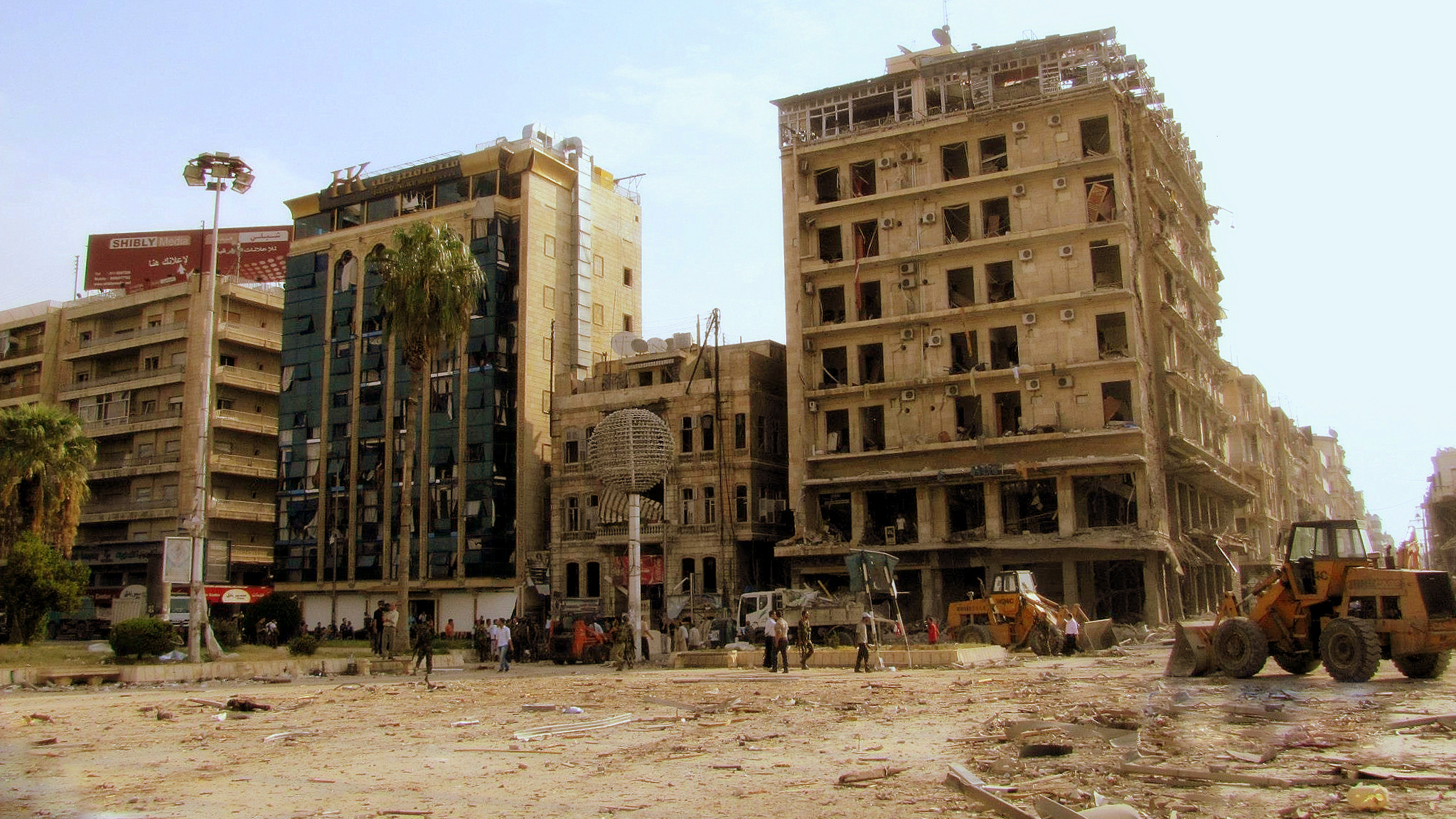
Saadallah Al-Jabiri after the October 2012 bombings

The square and its surrounding buildings were heavily damaged on October 3 2012 when three suicide car bombs exploded in the vicinity, killing 40 people and injuring 122 others. The Al-Qaeda affiliated Al-Nusra Front claimed responsibility.

== Gallery ==
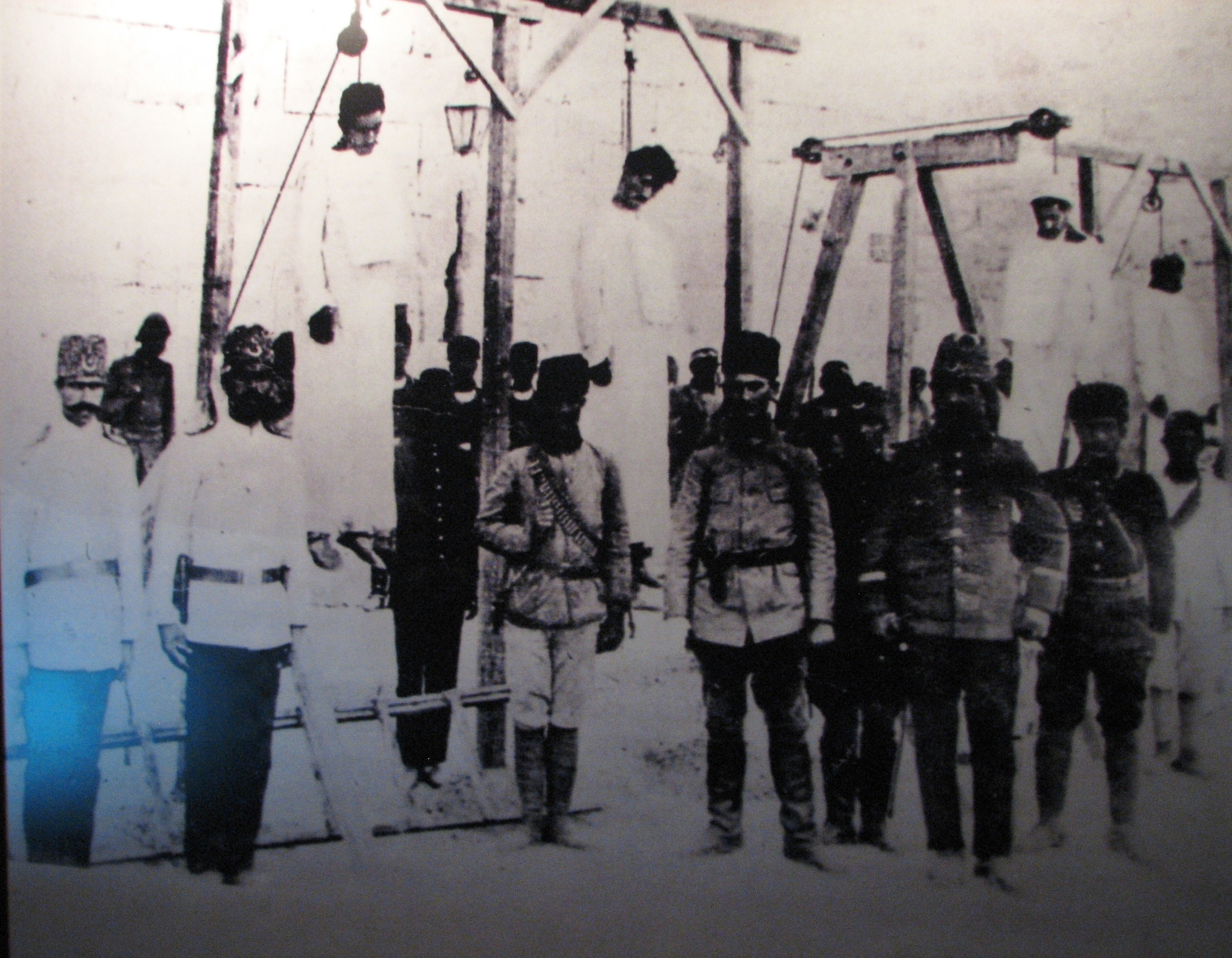
Armenian Doctors hanged in Aleppo Square 1916 during the Armenian genocide

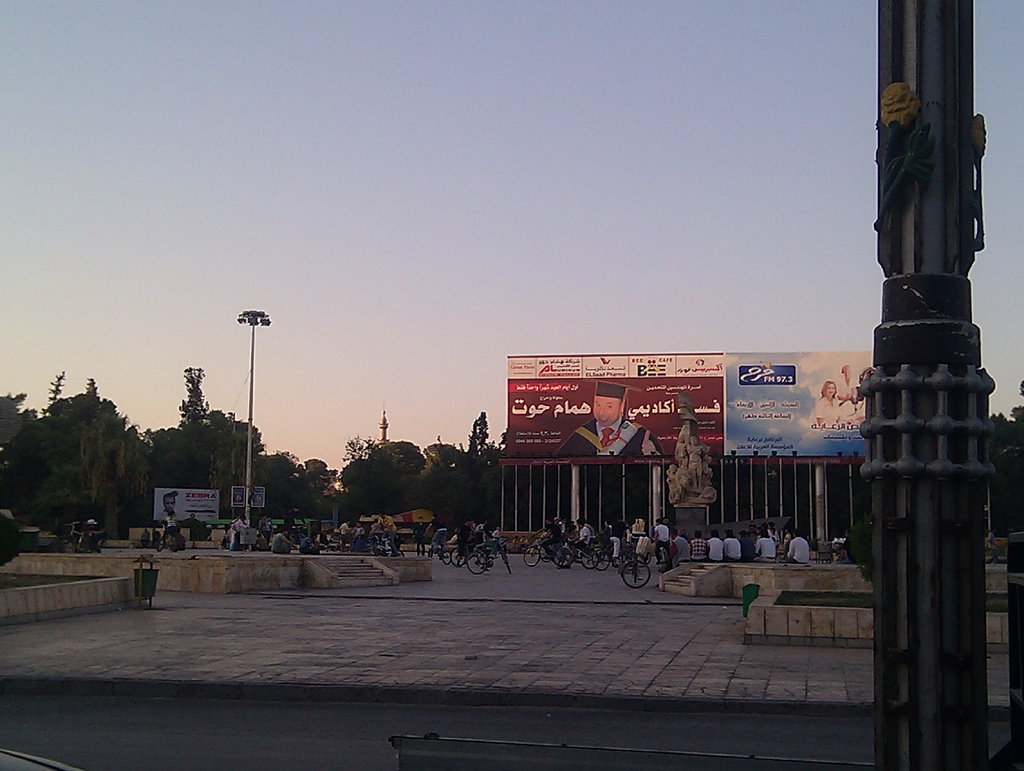
A view of the square in 2010

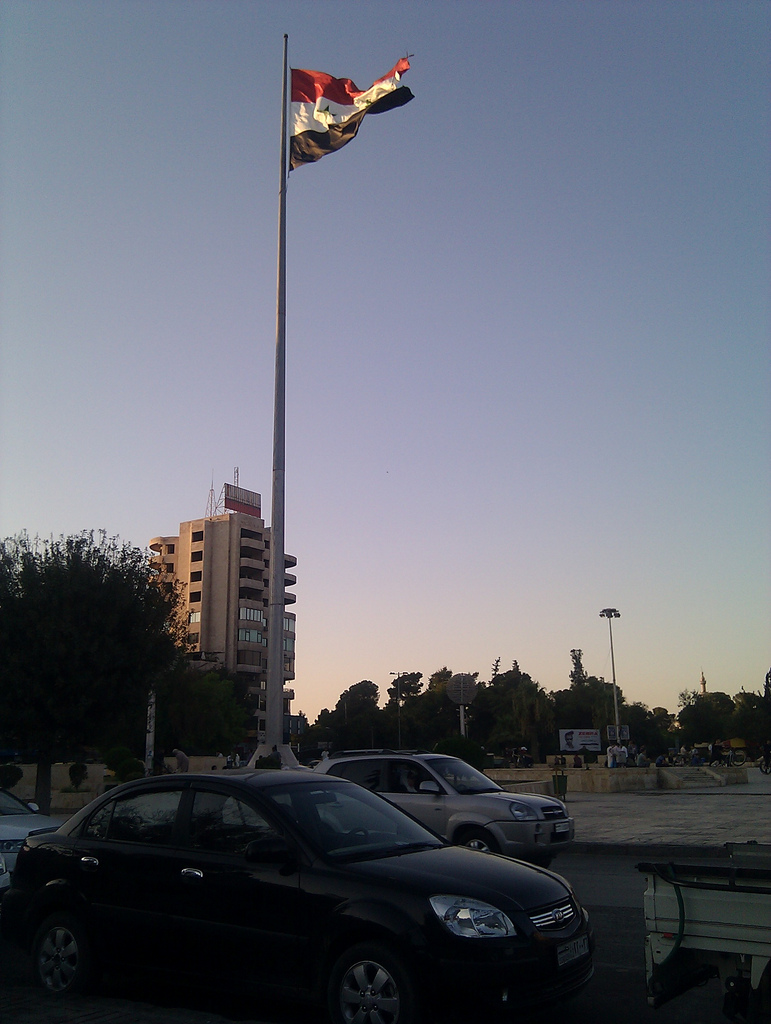
The then-Syrian flag at the square

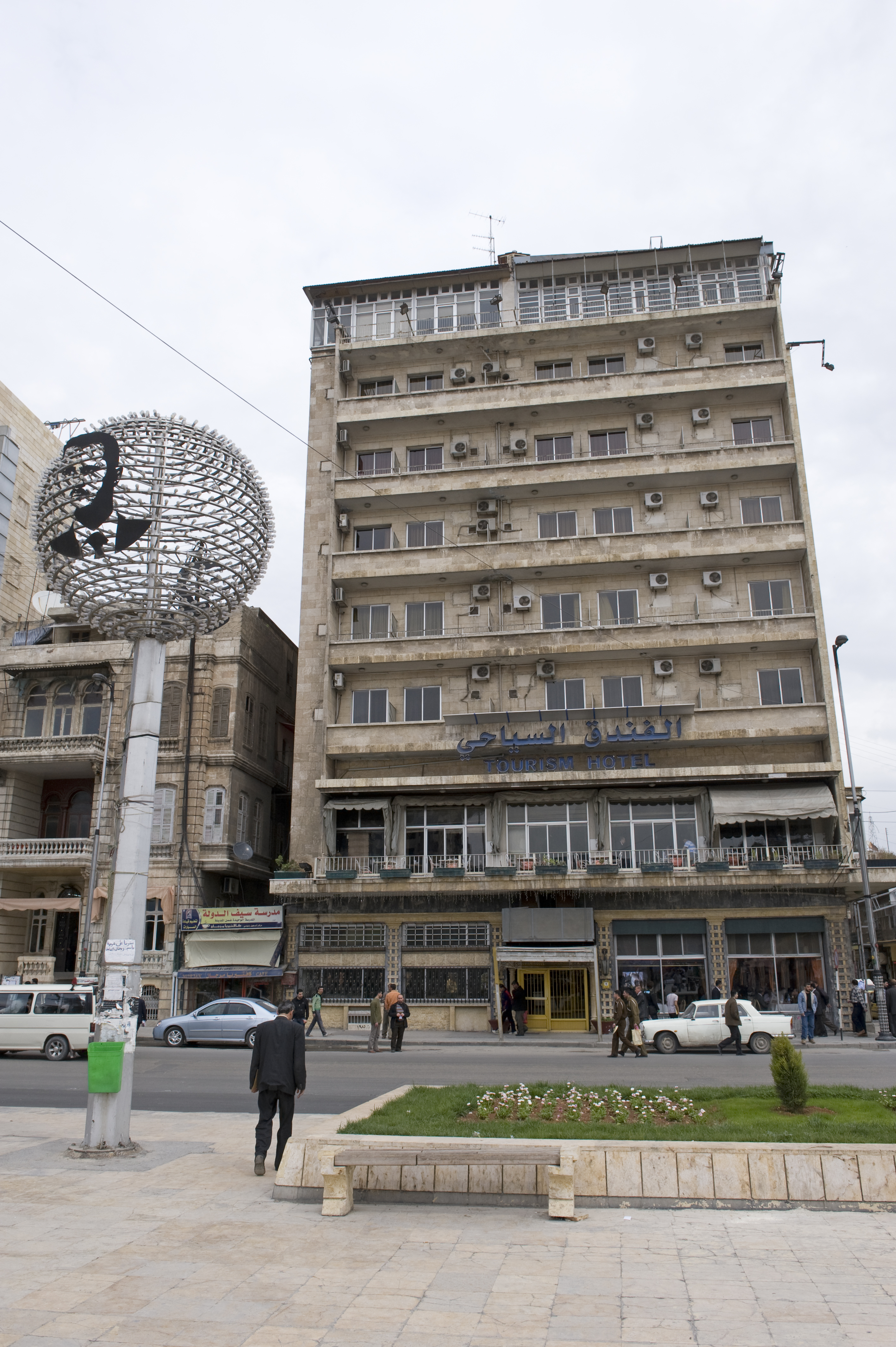
Aleppo Tourism Hotel at the square

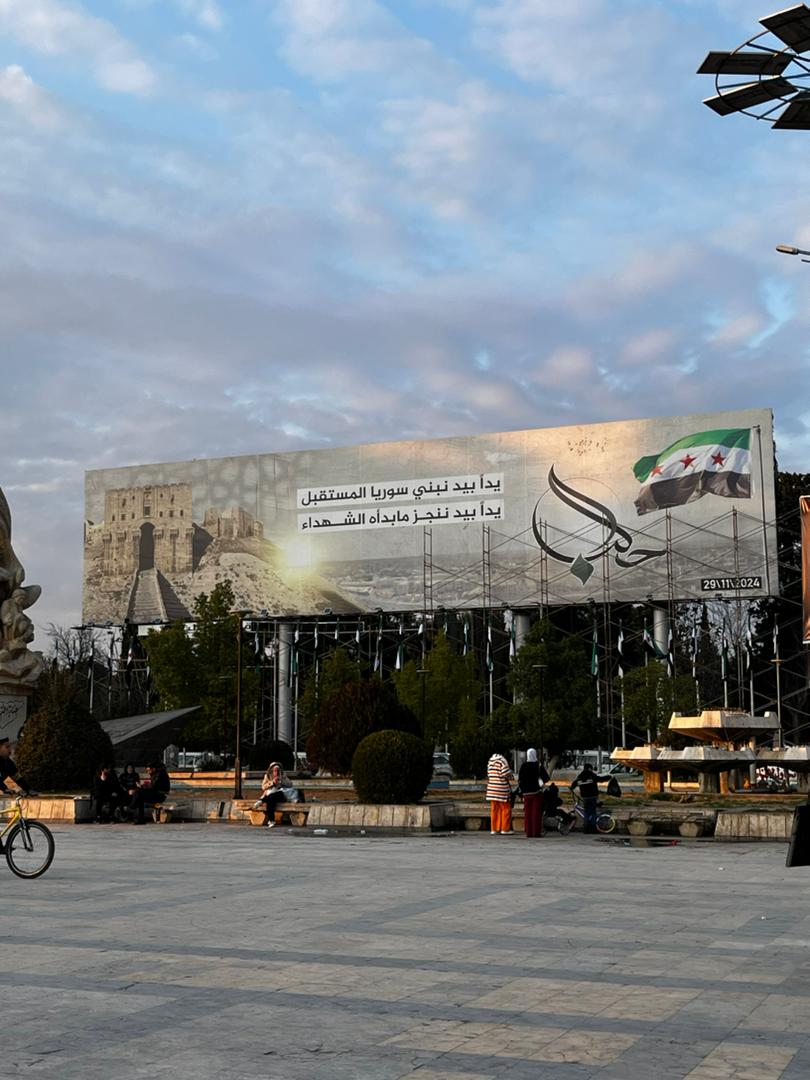
Billboard at the square after the fall of the Assad regime

== See also ==
- Saadallah al-Jabiri
- October 2012 Aleppo bombings
