= Combat operations in 2012 during the Battle of Aleppo =

Military engagements in Syria, 2012–2016

The combat operations in 2012 during the Battle of Aleppo were a series of intense military engagements between Syrian government forces and armed opposition groups, primarily the Free Syrian Army (FSA) and allied militias. It took place in and around Aleppo, Syria, during the early phase of the Battle of Aleppo in the Syrian civil war (2011-2024). These operations began in July 2012, when rebels launched coordinated attacks to seize control of key districts and infrastructure in Aleppo, Syria's largest city. The result was sustained urban warfare that soon drew in significant government reinforcements.

Both sides vied for strategic neighbourhoods including Salaheddine and Saif al-Dawla. Rebel forces initially made territorial gains in eastern and southern Aleppo, while government troops attempted counter offensives to regain lost ground. This phase of combat set the stage for the prolonged Battle of Aleppo, which continued for another four years until 2016. These operations had profound humanitarian and military consequences for the city and its civilian population.

== Rebel attack and capture of Eastern Aleppo ==
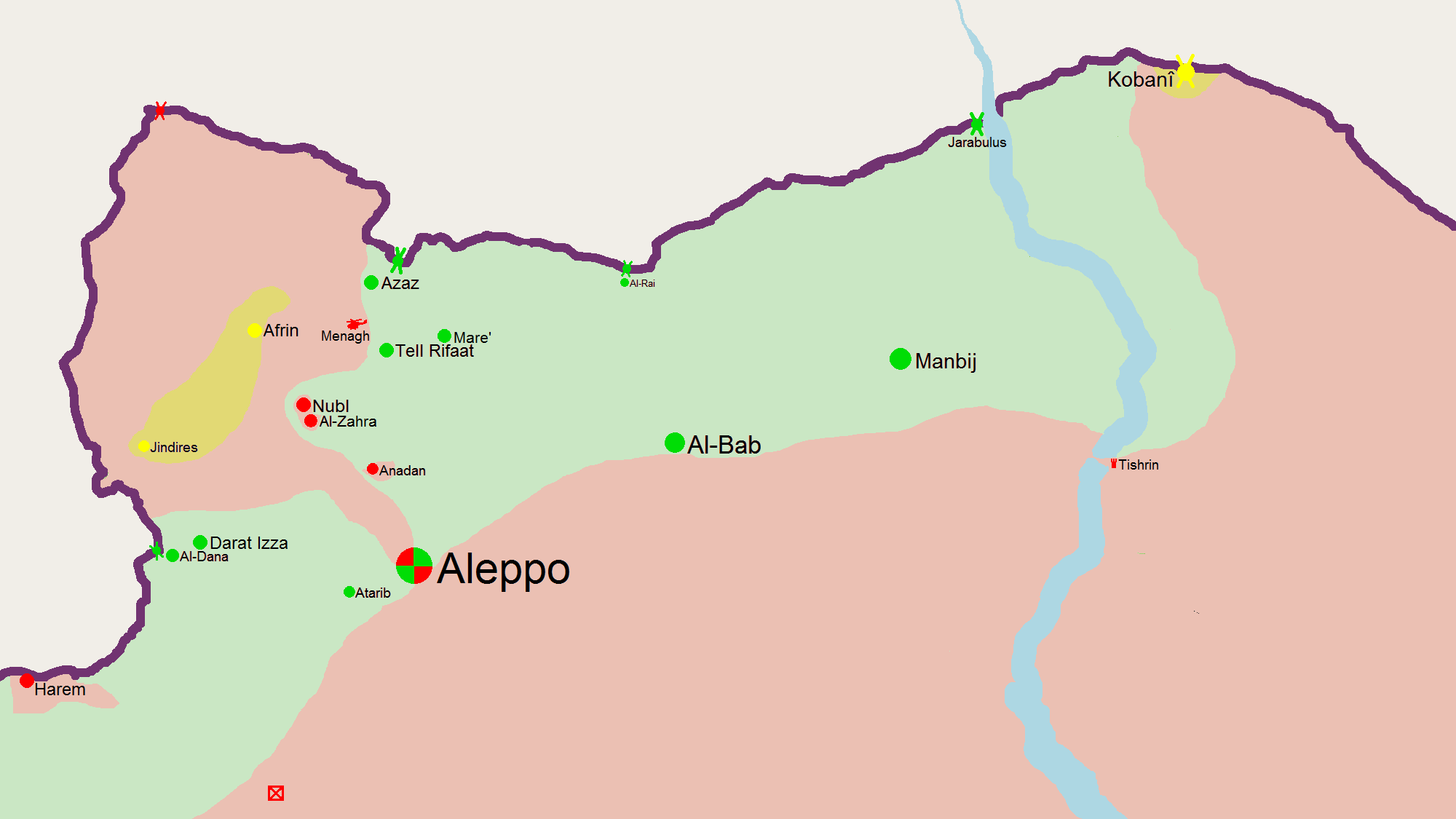
Map of northern Aleppo countryside on 20 July 2012.

A battle between rebels and security forces broke out on the night of 19 July 2012 in and around Salaheddine, a district in the city's southwest portion. It is unclear whether the district had a strong rebel presence before the battle began, or was captured by opposition fighters coming from the outskirts. Meanwhile, thousands of rebel soldiers from Aleppo's northern and eastern countryside began to move towards the city.

Fighting in Salaheddine continued into the next day, as the Syrian Army began shelling rebel-controlled districts with artillery and attack helicopters. By the early afternoon of 21 July, rebel forces had penetrated Aleppo's northeastern neighborhoods of Haydariya and Sakhur, where they clashed with the Syrian Army. The fighting drove many residents to safer areas.

On 22 July, fighting had spread from Salaheddine and neighboring Saif al-Dawla to Jameeliya and its surrounding neighborhoods near the city center, leading to a battle for the city's main intelligence headquarters. By the next day, rebels on the eastern front captured Helweniyeh, and according to a rebel commander, Hanano and the industrial area of Sheikh Najjar as well. Meanwhile, continuing clashes near the city center included a rebel attack on the state TV station and the central prison, where a massacre conducted by security forces had taken place, according to activists. Throughout the day, power was out in much of the city.

== Fighting in the city center and army reinforcements ==
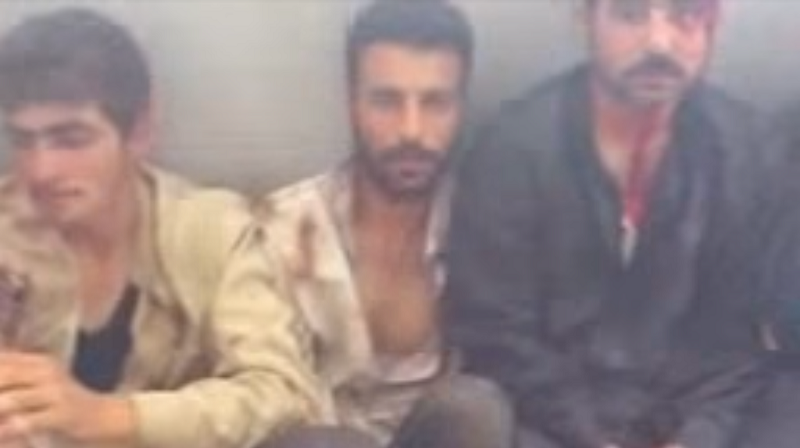
Berri clan's militiamen, considered to be "Shabiha", after their capture by the Tawhid Brigade in Aleppo, July 2012.

On 24 July 2012, according to Al Jazeera, the FSA launched an offensive to take the city center, leading to heavy fighting near the gates of the Old City, a UNESCO World Heritage Site. Rebel forces on the eastern front continued to push westwards. The FSA set up checkpoints in the eastern Sakhur district. Later that day, the Syrian Army employed fighter jets for the first time to bomb rebel-held districts.

During the next two days, the government sent thousands of reinforcements to Aleppo. The troops were sent mostly via the M5 highway connecting Damascus and Aleppo from the city's south, and the main Aleppo-Latakia road from the city's west. Rebels conducted deadly attacks on arriving troops. Among the reinforcements that massed on the outskirts of Aleppo were Special Forces units. By day's end 10,000 government soldiers had massed around Aleppo and its countryside. By comparison, 1,500 to 2,000 rebel fighters from around northern Syria arrived to assist the 2,000 already fighting. Fighting raged in the Old City and in the central districts of Jameeliya, Kallaseh, and Bustan al-Qasr.

On 27 July, skirmishes occurred on the outskirts as reinforcements continued to arrive. Rebel forces advanced to the central district of Fardous, despite ceaseless bombardment. Kurdish fighters, who had gained control over most of the Kurdish populated northern districts of Sheikh Maqsood and Ashrafiyeh, clashed with Syrian troops a day after they attacked a Kurdish convoy on the airport road.

== Salaheddine raid ==
Situation in Aleppo Governorate as of July 30, 2012.

On the morning of 28 July 2012, the Syrian Army started an attack against Salaheddine district, which held the largest concentration of rebels. The assault commenced with an eight-hour artillery bombardment, which started at four in the morning, after which tanks and ground troops moved in. During the clashes, rebels, providing unverified video footage, claimed to have shot down a government helicopter gunship, a rare feat. Rebels also claimed that 8–10 tanks and armored vehicles were destroyed. Rebel forces attacked a strategic police station in the city center for the third day, in an attempt to link up with opposition forces in the northeastern Sakhur district on the eastern front. By the end of the day, the rebels had repelled the assault, but the bombardment continued. Among the FSA fighters killed was a battalion commander. On the next day, fighting continued in Salaheddine. Syrian Army soldiers were reportedly defecting, bringing their tanks. In the evening, state media reported that Salaheddine had been recaptured by the Army. The opposition contrarily claimed to control 35 to 40 percent of the city.

== Continued rebel advance ==
In late July and early August 2012, the FSA continued its offensive in Aleppo, with both sides suffering high casualties. Rebel commanders said their main aim was to capture the city center. Rebels seized a strategic checkpoint in the town of Anadan north of Aleppo, gaining a direct route between the city and the Turkish border, an important rebel supply base. They also captured Al-Bab, northeast of the city, with an army base. Later, rebels attacked the Menagh Military Airbase, 30 km northwest of Aleppo, with arms and tanks captured at the Anadan checkpoint. Opposition forces continued to make territorial gains in the city, controlling most of eastern and southwestern Aleppo, including Salaheddine district and parts of Hamdaniya district. They continued to target security centers and police stations, as clashes erupted near the Air Force Intelligence Headquarters in Aleppo's northwestern Zahraa district. Rebels overran several police stations and posts in the central and southern districts of Bab al-Nairab, Myasar, and Salheen, seizing significant amounts of arms and ammunition.

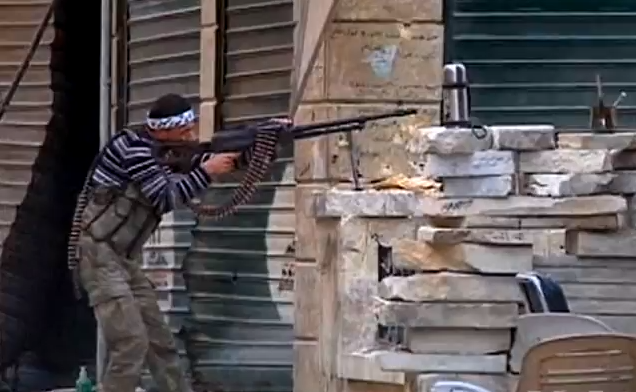
An FSA fighter engaged in a shootout on a street in Aleppo.

The Syrian military continued its attempt to capture Salaheddine, while bombing rebel-held territories throughout the city. Ambushes and executions were common. The Army appeared to have made little effort in sending ground forces to recapture the central and southern districts. The loyalist al-Berri militia began to clash with rebel forces in southern Aleppo and near the city's southeastern international airport. Clashes between the tribesmen and the rebels escalated after Zeino Berri's execution.

== Stalemate ==
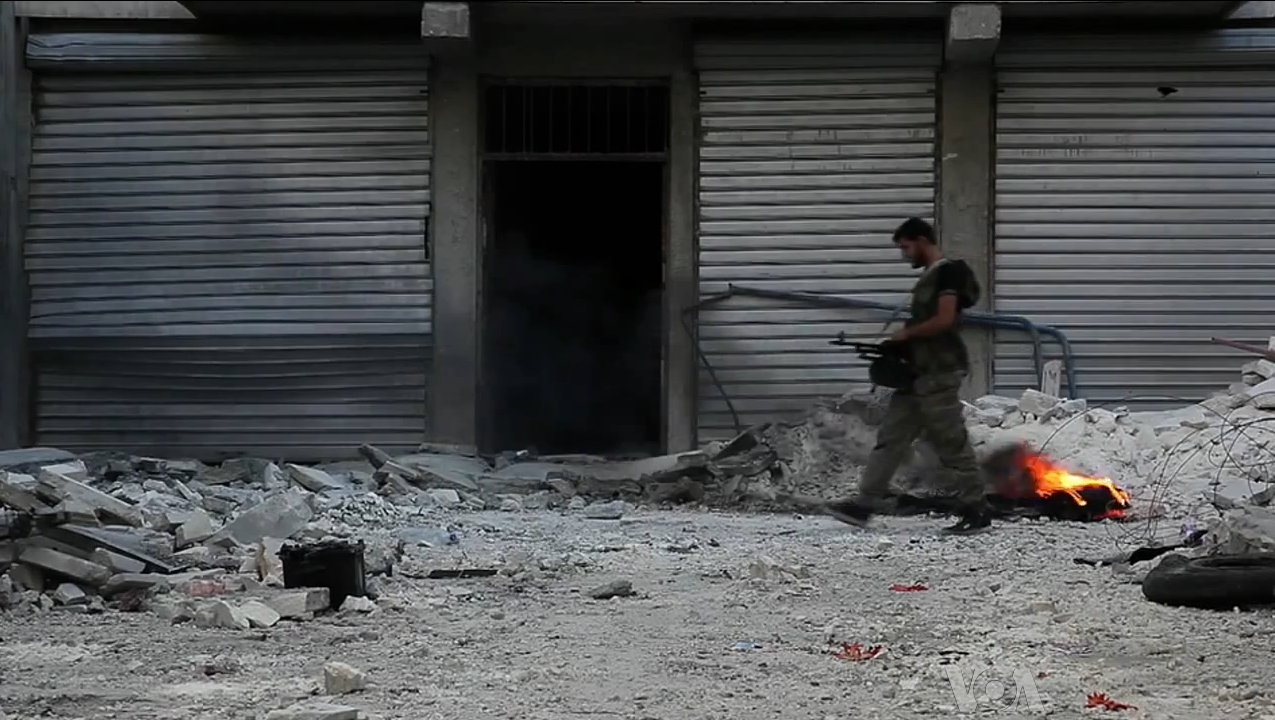
Free Syrian Army fighter walking among rubble in Aleppo.

From 3 to 5 August 2012, the rebel offensive began to stall. The Syrian Army finished deploying 20,000 reinforcements. Rebels retreated after they failed to capture Menagh Military Airbase and the state TV station in Izaa district, a few blocks northeast of Salaheddine district.

On 6 August, a rebel commander was killed in Salaheddine. The media center of the Tawhid Brigade, located in Sakhur district, was destroyed by an airstrike. Rebels attacked a checkpoint near Aleppo University. Fighting erupted near the Presidential Palace and government forces shelled rebel positions at the Palace of Justice and in Marjeh and Sha'ar (Terbet Lala) districts.

On 7 August, the ancient citadel in the city center was under siege by rebels who controlled the ground on at least two sides. The FSA had reportedly advanced to the Bab al-Jinan and Sabaa Bahrat districts amidst fierce clashes. In the north, rebels attempted to advance into a Kurdish district, clashing with Kurdish fighters. Jets bombed the area, forcing rebel forces to retreat. Opposition activists confirmed that Aleppo was completely surrounded by government troops.

Armored units inched forward on Salaheddine from the south and west. Military snipers deployed on rooftops and tanks were stationed in the streets. Snipers were also positioned in the local roundabout where they prevented rebel reinforcements and supplies from entering the district.

== Rebel withdrawal from Salaheddine ==
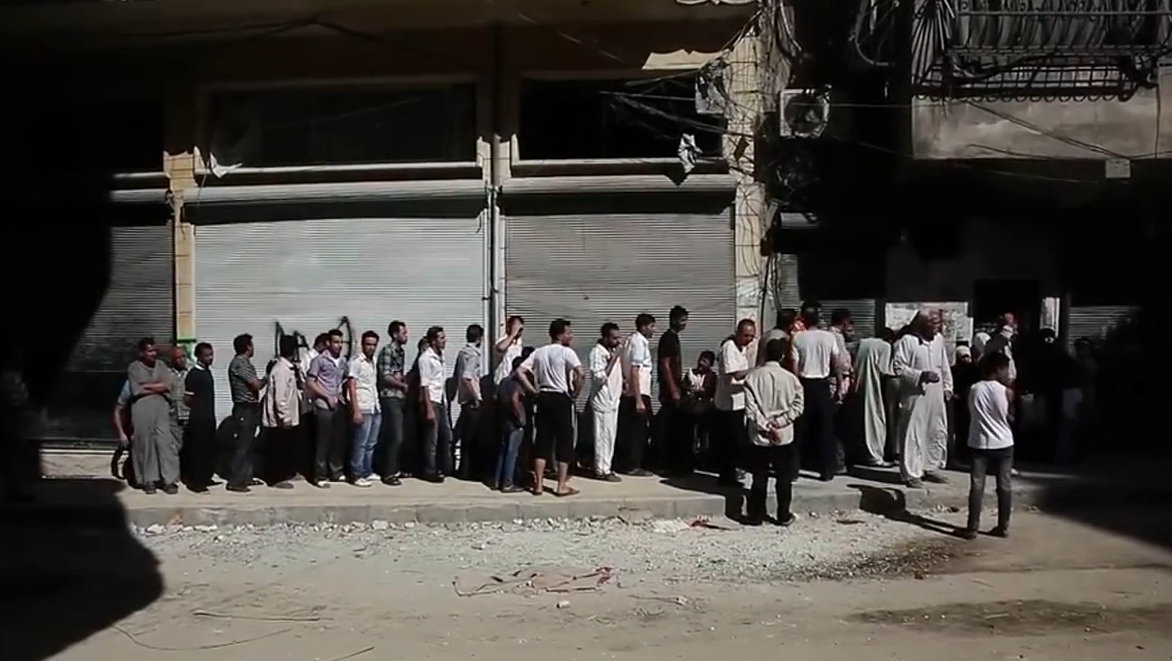
Aleppines waiting in a bread line while shelling continues.

On the morning of 8 August 2012, the Syrian military launched an offensive to retake Salaheddine district, a rebel stronghold that was an important southern supply route. The military hoped to link up with troops at the Citadel of Aleppo. Rebel fighters were reportedly low on ammunition and exhausted. After intense fighting and shelling in the district throughout the day, half a dozen Army tanks breached the center. In the early morning of the next day, artillery shelling intensified as more tanks moved in. FSA units began to depart. By mid-morning, hundreds of rebel fighters were pulling out of the district, with some leaving the city. Fearing a continued Army advance, some rebel units in nearby Saif al-Dawla and Bustan al-Qasr, districts east of Salaheddine, also began to evacuate. The withdrawal occurred while the city remained relatively quiet, as government forces made little attempt to advance. During the evening of 9 August, troops and armored vehicles, accompanied by the Mukhabarat and the Shabiha, moved into the neighborhood, searching house to house for remaining rebels, as snipers began setting up positions.

Fighting continued in the central district of Bab al-Hadid and the southeast district of Bab al-Nairab. Rebel fighters made attempts to recapture Salaheddine, but were held back by snipers and mortar fire.

== Army attack on Saif al-Dawla ==
Approximate situation in Aleppo Governorate, mid-August 2012.

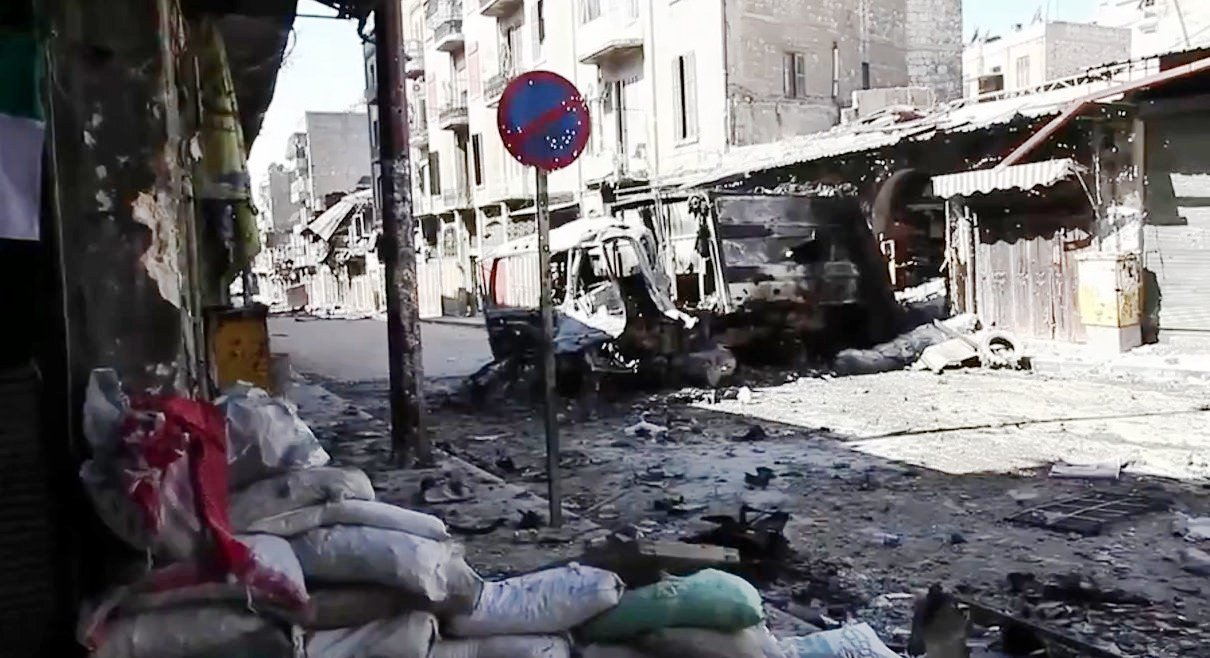
Bombed out vehicles after street fighting.

On 12 August 2012, tanks advanced to the roundabout in Salaheddine district, which was defended by 150 rebels. During the day, rebels attacked a petrol station in Salaheddine, which was being used as a military base, and killed the base's commander and captured badly needed ammunition and weapons.

On 13 August, the Army advanced into the western portion of the Saif al-Dawla district. Security sources in Damascus also stated that the Army was advancing on the rebel-held district of Sukkari. SOHR said opposition fighters attacked a key Syrian Air Force Intelligence branch in the western Zahraa district. Rebels again attacked the radio and television station in Aleppo.

Video footage showed rebels shooting down a MiG-23BN fighter and executions of prisoners in and around Aleppo by rebel forces. Opposition activists claimed that rebels had nothing to do with the killings.

On 15 August, rebels reported that they captured Bab al-Nasr and the surrounding area, forcing soldiers to retreat to the city centre.

Situation in Aleppo city, mid-August 2012

On 17 August, heavy fighting was reported at Aleppo International Airport, a strategic gateway to the city. According to SANA, rebels were "pushed out from areas on both sides of the airport".

On 18 August, Army clearing operations were reported in the areas of Al-Andalus school, Al-Hayat Hospital, Rahmo Khatab school, Al-Hamiyat Hospital and Ahmad Saeed school. The army claimed to have taken the area of Maysaloun Hospital. On 20 August, the Japanese TV reporter Mika Yamamoto was killed, the first in Aleppo. On 21 August, both sides claimed advances, although neither could be independently verified.

On 22 August, rebels tried to make an advance in Saif al-Dawla, but their attack was repelled by heavy mortar and RPG fire. Government forces shelled Aleppo and two neighbouring towns. The army bombarded rebel weapon stocks to keep them out of the city, according to a security official. He also said reinforcements for both sides were heading to Aleppo.

== Clashes in Christian districts ==
On 23 August 2012, the military reportedly captured three Christian neighborhoods in the Old City, according to residents contacted by AFP. The districts of Jdeydeh, Tela and Suleimaniyeh had been captured by opposition forces five days before. One resident claimed the Army was celebrated by hundreds of residents, who set up committees to avoid a potential return of the rebels. The main rebel commander had, earlier in the day, claimed that rebel fighters were near the districts. The military capture was later confirmed by AFP. The capture of the Jdeydeh quarter was initiated by the residents, who took up arms after the rebels set up checkpoints and fired on residents and churches (around Farhat Square). They stormed Al-Hatab Square where most rebels were positioned and took control of it. The Army later joined the Christian militia to expel the rebels from the quarter.

CBS News learned that at least 48 of Aleppo's elite businessmen, calling themselves the "Front of Aleppo Islamic Scholars" (FAIS), hand-picked a provisional city council to take over as Aleppo's new local government. The 48 businessmen were financiers for the Syrian government, who thereby switched sides to the rebels.

== War of attrition ==
Rebels tried to stop government tanks that were advancing from Saif al-Dawla district. The Army was also moving in the Sukkari district and rebel fighters complained of RPG shortages.

The opposition activist group SOHR reported that the Army was trying to take control of Izaa district while state TV claimed the district had been captured from rebels.

On 28 August 2012, SANA claimed the Children's Hospital in Saif al-Dawla was cleared by the Army.

Reports indicated that the Syrian government was indiscriminately attacking civilians at bakeries with artillery rounds and rockets in opposition-controlled areas. Human Rights Watch labeled these as war crimes, as the only military targets were rebels manning the bakeries and that dozens of civilians were killed.

On 31 August, rebel fighters announced a major offensive, attacking security compounds and bases. Activists claimed that three warplanes were destroyed when rebels attacked Kuweires Military Airport. Warplanes and artillery continued to fire on rebel positions. SOHR reported that the fighting happened in Sukkari, Hanano and Bustan al-Qasr districts.

On 3 September, a Syrian general said that the Army controlled the upper area of Saif al-Dawla and that they were trying to take the whole district. AFP reporters visited Salaheddine district and confirmed that it was under Army control. AFP reported that the Army had captured, two days before, two 10-story malls on either side of the main street in Saif al-Dawla, which had been used by rebel snipers.

On 6 September, Kurdish activists reported that 21 civilians were killed in the Kurdish neighborhood of Sheikh Maqsood when the Army shelled the local mosque and nearby areas. Despite not directly witnessing clashes, residents believed that the attack was in retaliation for locals sheltering anti-government civilians from other districts. The Kurdish Supreme Committee and People's Defense Units vowed retaliation.

== Hanano and Midan fighting ==
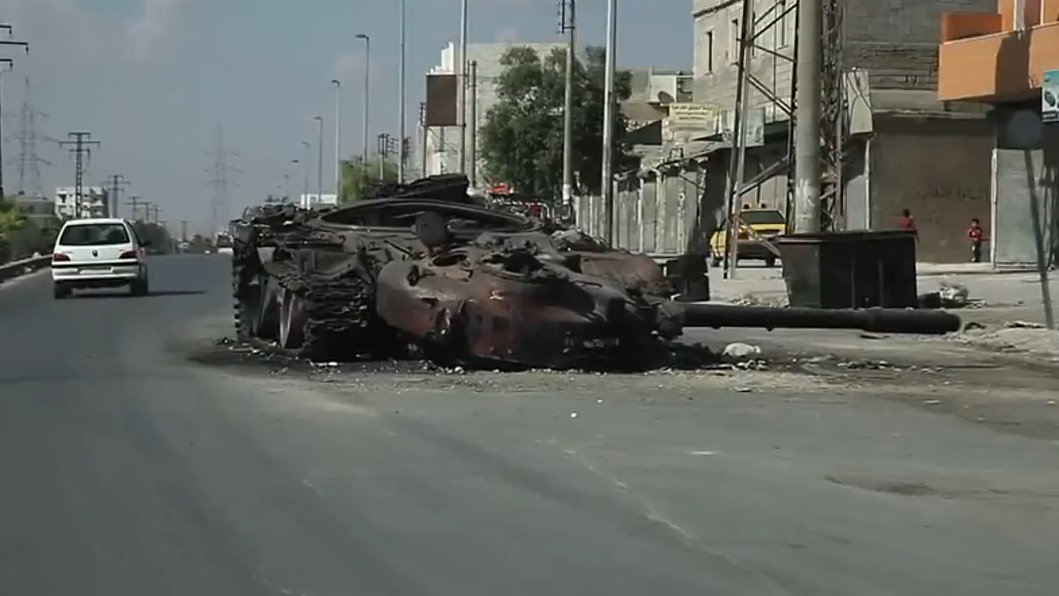
A destroyed tank on a road in Aleppo.

On 7 September 2012, rebels attacked the Hanano military base. The FSA managed to free 350 detainees when they overran one of the main security buildings. Those wishing to defect were sent to various fighter positions in the region, while others remained in detention. Several rebel brigades were assigned to the attack. The rebels tried to cut strategic supply lines and silence the artillery. The Army retook the base the next day, after a 20-hour battle with heavy casualties on both sides. The base served as a weapons storage depot, a conscript recruitment centre and housed the headquarters of the local branch of the military police and anti-riot police. According to SOHR, rebels stormed the area reserved for conscript recruitment.

On 8 September, SOHR reported that the Syrian Army advanced in Sa'ad al-Ansari, Izaa, Saif al-Dawla and Salaheddine, following the withdrawal of rebel forces after heavy shelling. 21 Kurdish civilians were killed in the Sheikh Maqsood neighborhood when Army forces shelled an area near the Marouf mosque, according to Kurdish activists.

Aleppo's main water pump was destroyed during the day. The Syrian government and opposition accused the other of the destruction.

On 9 September, a car bomb killed at least 30 civilians and wounded more than 64. The governor of Aleppo said that the bombing took place near Al-Hayat Hospital and the Central Hospital. The bombing caused significant material damage to the two hospitals, Al-Nusour al-Zahabiya elementary school and nearby buildings. The next day the FSA took responsibility for the attack, claiming that the facilities were used by government troops. The attack was executed after the Syrian Air Force bombed rebel targets in Hanano district, killing dozens.

During the day, another car bomb exploded near Qutaybah bin Muslim al-Bahili school in Shuhada neighbourhood. The bomb killed three civilians and injured six.

On 10 September, a three-day rebel assault on the Midan district was defeated and government forces pushed the rebels toward the Turkmen district of Bustan al-Basha. At the same time, at least 20 Syrian soldiers were executed by the rebels after they had been captured at the Hanano barracks. The executors were members of the Hawks of Syria Brigade.

Over the night of 11–12 September, the Army pounded rebel positions, focusing on the southern districts of Bustan al-Qasr, Sukkari and Kallaseh and the northeastern districts of Sakhur, Sha'ar and Hanano. One resident said that helicopter gunships strafed the rebel district of Bustan al-Basha. Fighting took place at dawn 12 September in Al-Nayrab area, five kilometres north of the airport in response to a rebel attack on the airport; the airport remained fully operational.

On 13 September, Syrian Observatory for Human Rights (SOHR) reported that 11 people were killed in an airstrike by warplanes in the Helweniyeh neighbourhood.

Rebel fighters reportedly advanced into Midan, a highly strategic area that opens the way into the main square. One resident said that "They were at Bustan al-Basha district and had already advanced up to Suleiman al-Halabi Street. Now they have entered a street in Midan," after heavy clashes were reported.

The fighting in Midan continued into the next day, centering on two police stations. The rebels captured the stations, were driven out by the military, returned in a counterattack, and were attacked again. Syrian Arab News Agency (SANA) claimed that the Army had cleared areas around the Hreitani building, Sports Institute and the Maternity Hospital. The rebels turned St. Gregory Church into a battlefield when they tried to progress in Midan, before being forced back by heavy Army resistance.

During the night, it was reported that the Army conducted airstrikes on the two police stations, forcing the rebels to retreat. An airstrike was also conducted against a rebel-held police station in Hanano.

On 15 September, the Army controlled most of Midan district and set up checkpoints for the first time. Rebels still held some positions on the border between Midan and the rebel-held Bustan al-Basha and Arkub districts. Clashes continued at the entrance of Bustan al-Basha and another airstrike hit the police post in Hanano. SANA reported that the Army had clashed with rebels in Firdous and Midan.

On 16 September, rebel fighters made another attempt to push back into Midan. They fired RPGs through a wall encircling an Armenian Orthodox church from their stronghold in Suleiman al-Halabi Street. They then rushed the courtyard of the church but were driven back. Later, the military announced that the armed forces had completely cleared the Midan area and taken control of the district. This was confirmed by an AFP correspondent on the ground, although he said that there were a few areas where snipers were still active. The military advanced into the rebel-held Arkub district. A unit of the Republican Guard attacked and captured Al-Ansar Mosque in the rebel-controlled Arkub district. The mosque had strategic importance, located directly in front of the Hanano military base.

== Continued clashes ==
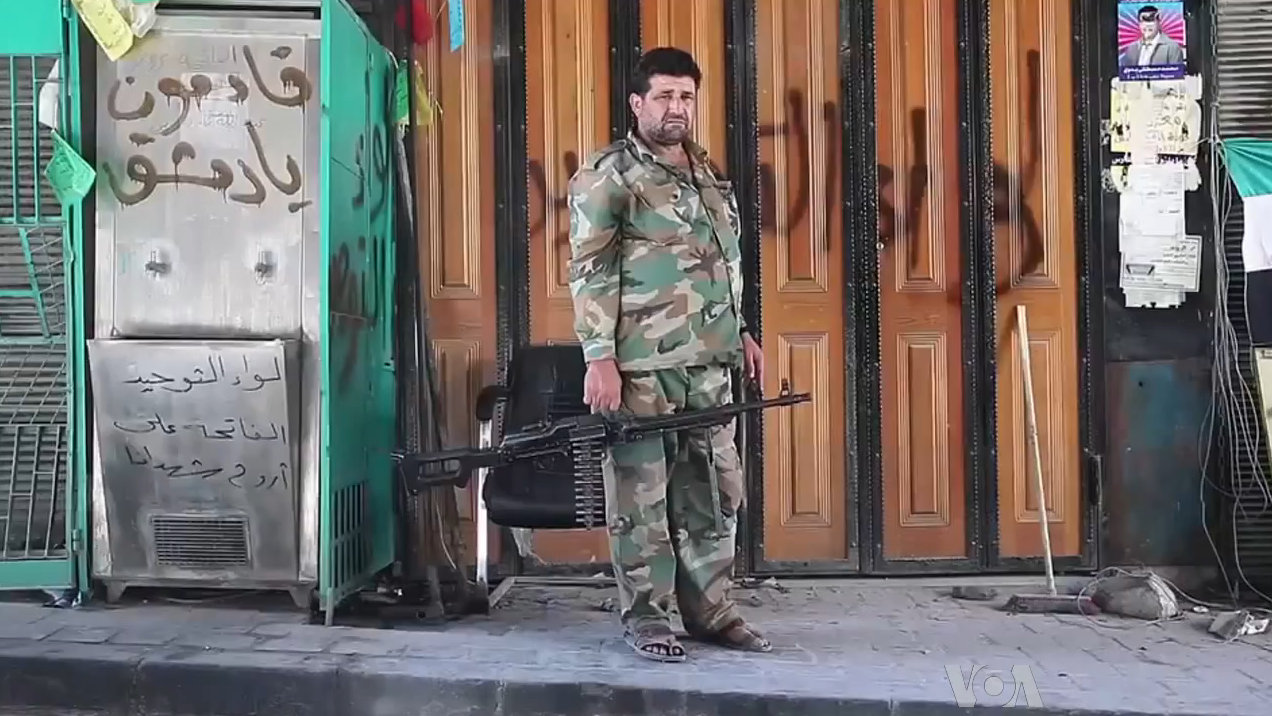
A Free Syrian Army soldier standing in front of a door with a machine gun.

On 18 September 2012, clashes were occurring in Izaa and the government-held western Zahraa district.

The rebels in Aleppo, due to a lack of foreign supplies, were manufacturing their own weapons. The rebels denied receiving any foreign support in the form of weapons. A rebel commander named Abdelkader el-Hadji stated "The weapons we have now we captured from Assad's army. We now have a few tanks. Where do you think we got them? We took them from Assad."

On 20 September, the Syrian Army launched an operation to recapture Bustan al-Qasr. Killings occurred near al-Fidaa al-Arabi school. SANA said that other clashes occurred in Hanano, al-Fatayes quarter in Jdeydeh and Arkub districts and Qadi Askar roundabout. SANA said "heavy losses" were inflicted upon the rebels. Government troops engaged in street battles in the rebel-held Suleiman al-Halabi district, adjacent to Midan.

Opposition forces attempted to unite the two largest rebel groups in Aleppo and the surrounding countryside under one command, so they could better coordinate. Analysts claimed that the stalemate was due to the Army's low morale and an inability to reinforce and resupply troops from Damascus via the M5 highway. The government discussed the use of chemical weapons as a last resort, and Der Spiegel reported that the Syrian government had restarted chemical weapons tests in nearby Safira at the end of August. Aleppo activists reported 37 civilians killed within Aleppo city from the Army's overnight bombardment.

Over the night of 20/21 September, fighting erupted near the Hanano military base, SOHR said. Bustan al-Qasr was still under attack after the Army attempted to recapture it. The Army also attacked Sakhur during the day. Clashes were reported in Sakhur roundabout where dozens of rebels had been killed, SANA said.

On 22 September, SANA said that the Army had recaptured the Third Industrial Institute in Suleiman al-Halabi neighbourhood and destroyed several rebel centres. The fighting for Suleiman al-Halabi had started two days before. The next day, the Syrian Army had recaptured Qasr al-Wali restaurant in Al-Sayyid Ali neighborhood, which was used as a rebel operations centre, according to SANA.

On 24 September, SANA said the Syrian Army took the Agricultural Institute and areas of Al-Quran Mosque and Ali Nasser Agha School in Suleiman al-Halabi. SANA claimed that the Syrian Army also recaptured the Christian Jdeydeh neighbourhood.

On 25 September, an Army source told AFP that the Army's operations in Arkub were finished and that the Army was involved in a door-to-door search for rebels. However, SOHR said that clashes were ongoing in Arkub. SANA also reported continuing clashes in Suleiman al-Halabi and that clashes occurred in the western Sakhur area and near Al-Hakim Hospital in Sha'ar area.

AFP reported on a meeting of rebel brigade commanders, at which the overall assessment of the situation was that they were in a stalemate due to a lack of ammunition, despite the capture of 5,000 assault rifles and 2,500 rocket launchers during the earlier raid on the Hanano military base.

== September rebel offensive ==
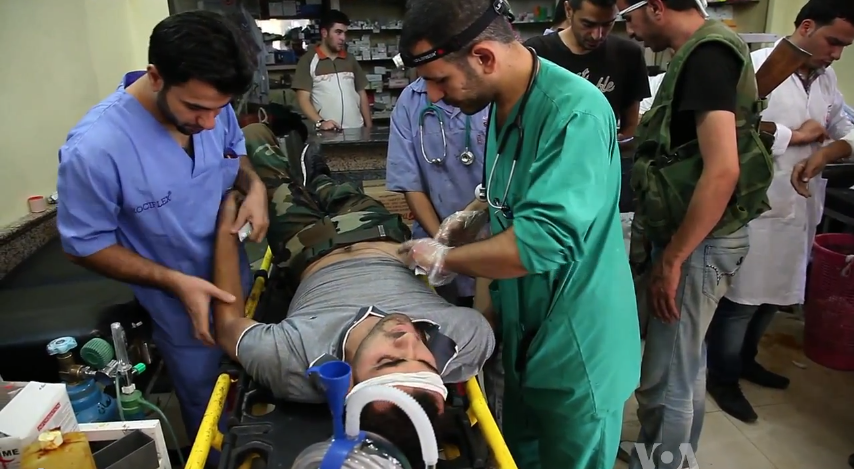
Doctors and medical staff treating injured rebel fighters in Aleppo.

According to multiple sources, a new opposition offensive began on 27 September 2012, which promised to be "zero hour" in the start of a "decisive battle" to capture the city. A rebel commander said they wanted to surprise the Army, which had started to creep forward towards the southern neighborhoods. He claimed the Tawhid Brigade was enticing the Army forward. The operation included 6,000 fighters of the Tawhid Brigade, in addition to brigades such as the Fatah Brigade and Ahfad al-Fatiheen Brigade for the Turkmen. Weapons and ammunition captured during the attack on the Hanano base were used. He denied that the FSA had proclaimed "decisive" battles for Aleppo before.

The government texted most of the mobile/cellphones in the area that read in part: "You have two choices; either be killed facing the State or the State will kill you to get rid of you, you decide...the game is over...the countdown has begun to expel all militants from neighboring countries...". The message was sent to all Syrians with subscriptions to the country's two cellphone service providers in the Aleppo area.

On the second day of the offensive, there was a growing threat of clashes between the rebels and a Kurdish militia believed to be linked to the PKK. The rebels, who grew suspicious over some Kurdish militants' ties with the government, also threatened to confront groups they said were linked to the PKK in neighboring Turkey. Tawhid Brigade commander Abdul Qader Saleh, requested that the Kurdish militia surrender and "not drag themselves into a losing battle that is not their fight." Shortly thereafter, rebels attempted to advance into the Kurdish-held Sheikh Maqsood district in the north, where they reported capturing eight Shabiha militiamen. Opposition activists and rebels reported that the Kurdish militia engaged the rebels and fought alongside government troops against the rebel forces in Sheikh Maqsood. SANA said that district residents were fighting alongside the Syrian army against the rebel offensive.

Fighting was reported in central and southern parts of the city. The main points of the rebel attack close to the center were towards the government-held Hamidiya and Midan districts. Residents in previously peaceful neighborhoods told AFP that the violence was "unprecedented", saying "The sound from the fighting has been non-stop", "Everyone is terrified. I have never heard anything like this before." In the south, rebels advanced through the Izaa, Saif al-Dawla and Sukkari districts. Rebel commander Abu Furat said that during the fighting a regular army base was taken in Salaheddine and 25 soldiers were killed before they were forced to retreat. According to one rebel, 20 of their fighters were killed and 60 wounded during the fighting. FSA forces also reportedly suffered heavy losses in the Bdama neighborhood, where a rebel battalion's first lieutenant was killed. Rebels reported that one of their units was surrounded during the clashes, while some other battalions pulled out of the frontline or had never joined the battle.

The leader of the Sham Falcon's brigade claimed the rebel fighters were able to progress in Arkub, Maysaloun, Abdulla al-Jaberi square, Hamdaniya and Jameeliya. He said that the Syrian army was using planes and barrels of explosives, and "there were ferocious battles in Salaheddine and Ameriyah and Sukkari. It is a guerrilla war. The Syrian army would come forward 10 metres, we would move forward 50 metres and then if we need to pull back, we pull back." SOHR's Abdel Rahman said, "Neither the regime nor the rebels are able to gain a decisive advantage."

Rebels claimed to have stormed a government radio station, while government warplanes bombed the city's outskirts. A major fire engulfed Aleppo's medieval markets, destroying an estimated 700 to 1,000 shops. A major tourist attraction, the covered markets were among the largest in the Middle East. The rebels blamed the fire on army shelling. According to SANA, clashes took place in Kallaseh, Fardous, Bab al-Nairab, Bab al-Hadid and Bustan al-Qasr. According to the Irish Times, the rebel offensive had dissolved in a street fight after the Syrian Army tenaciously defended its positions. Irish Times and Reuters reported that some rebels units were surrounded and others retreated even before entering the city. According to SANA, the Army was in full control of Ameriyah and most of Tal az-Zarazir streets. SOHR said that clashes were taking place in Arkub and Aziziya, while Salaheddine had once again become a focal point.

On the third day of the offensive, an activist claimed to CNN that rebels had taken control of at least four neighborhoods and rebels were reported to have fired mortars at al-Nairab Military Airport, damaging two helicopters and a main runway. The Syrian government denied that helicopters were destroyed, claiming that those reports were an attempt to raise rebel morale. According to SANA, the Army targeted positions and inflicted losses near the Infirmary and the Sport Institute in Bustan al-Basha and near the Cotton Gins area, east and north of al-Jandoul in north Aleppo. Another operation is mentioned near the crossroads of Baleh town, west of Aleppo, with rebel casualties. SANA also said clashes occurred in Qastal Harami, al-Sayyed Ali and Maysaloun Hospital areas. A Turkish fighter, who led an armed rebel unit and its members was reported dead in clashes with the army in al-Tananeer Square.

Opposition fighters from the Tawhid Brigade and other northern brigades announced that they had partially taken over the Jandoul roundabout in Aleppo. Fighters also said 15 government soldiers were killed and three tanks were destroyed.

However, overall, the rebel offensive had stalled and opposition fighters were struggling to hold on to their positions under heavy artillery fire. One rebel described the current situation as 'boring' with the battle becoming yet another stalemate. Rebels blamed the stalemate on their low ammunition and inferior firepower.

== Aleppo Square bombings, Old City and Eastern Aleppo fighting ==
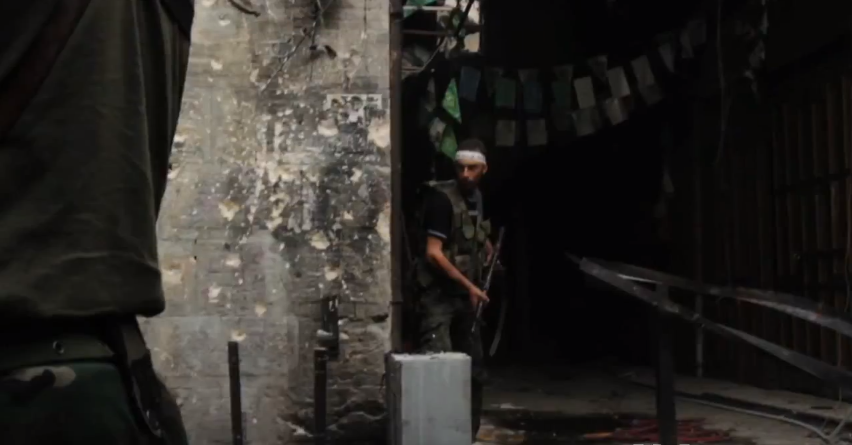
FSA fighters in a firefight in the Old City of Aleppo.

On 1 October 2012, SOHR said that more than 40 were either killed or injured by bombs in the Karm al-Jabal neighborhood in the Sha'ar area. Several neighborhoods were bombed including Shakhur and Salaheddine. The next day, rebels claimed to have repulsed attacks in Hanano, and that they were in control of most of the Old City in the face of heavy artillery fire. The rebels appeared to be moving towards the city center.

The pro-government Lebanese Al-Diyar newspaper announced that Bassar al-Assad had flown to Aleppo by helicopter at dawn and had ordered 30,000 additional government troops and 2,000 personnel carriers from Hama Governorate (army units 5 and 6). SANA made no mention of any visit.

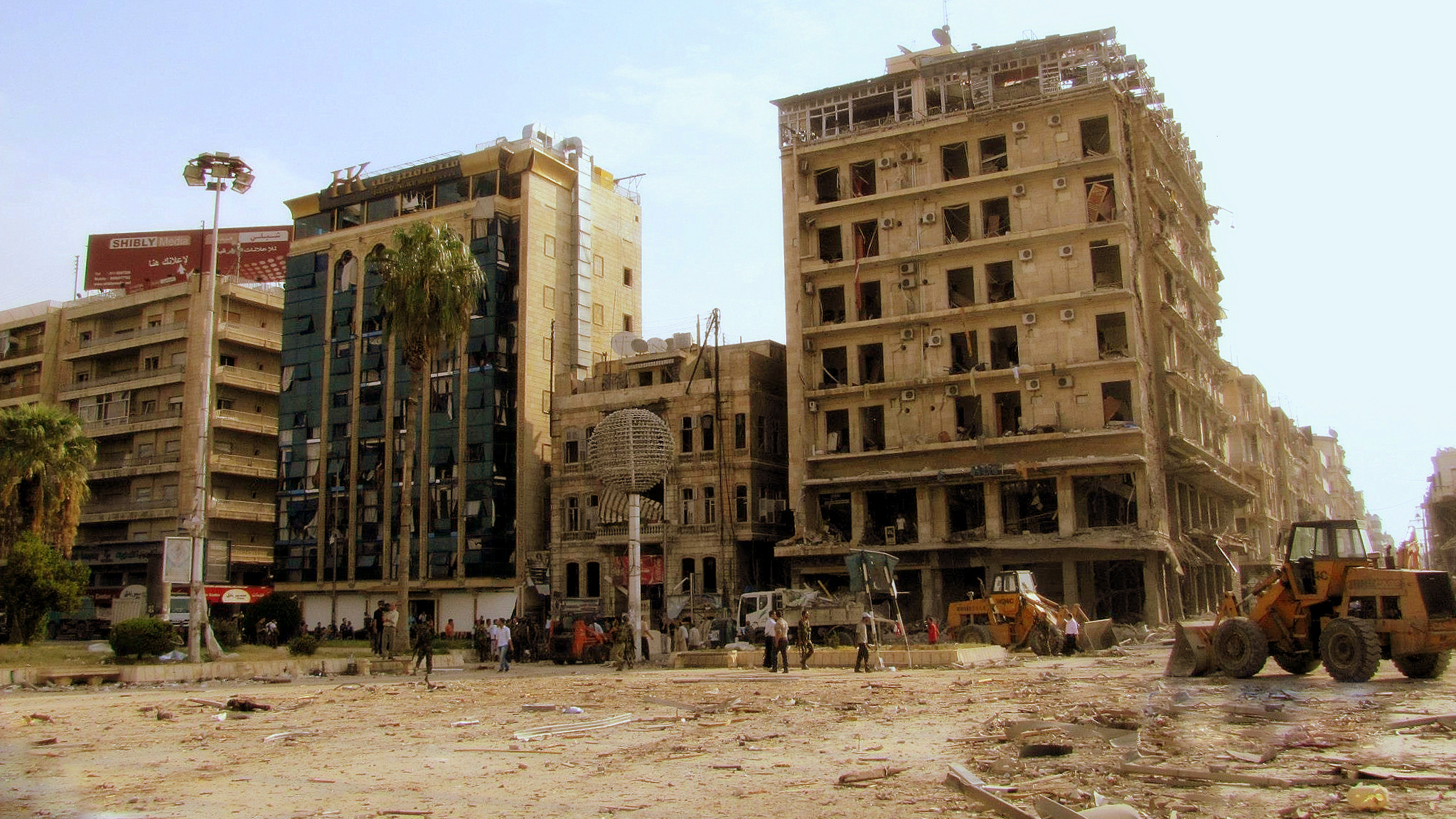
The scene at Saadallah Al-Jabiri Square after the suicide bomb attacks of 3 October 2012.

On 3 October, three suicide car bombs exploded at the eastern corner of the central Saadallah Al-Jabiri Square, killing 34 people. More than 122 people were reported to be heavily injured. Islamist militant group Al-Nusra Front claimed responsibility. The bombs targeted the Officers' Club and the nearby buildings of the Touristic Hotel and the historic Jouha Café. The hotel received major damage while the café was entirely destroyed. A small building within the Officers' Club was ruined as well.

Government troops killed two more would-be suicide bombers before they could detonate their explosives. Syrian state TV showed the bodies of three men wearing army uniforms at the bomb site. One of them appeared to be wearing an explosive belt with a timer tied to his wrist. Later, Al-Qaeda-linked extremist militant group Al-Nusra Front claimed responsibility. The group stated that it was carried out by suicide car bombers, followed by attackers disguised as Army soldiers. The UN Security Council unanimously condemned the bombings as a "terrorist attack".

Rebel fighters attacked a political intelligence branch as well as an old vegetable market where a large number of troops were posted, according to the Observatory. Overnight, rebels reportedly destroyed two tanks in the city. The Army battled rebels in several neighbourhoods, including Saif al-Dawla and Sakhur. It also shelled the Bab al-Nairab, Salaheddine, Mashhad, Bab al-Nasr and Sakhur districts. The fighting led to the destruction of an Army tank and the killing of several Army troops.

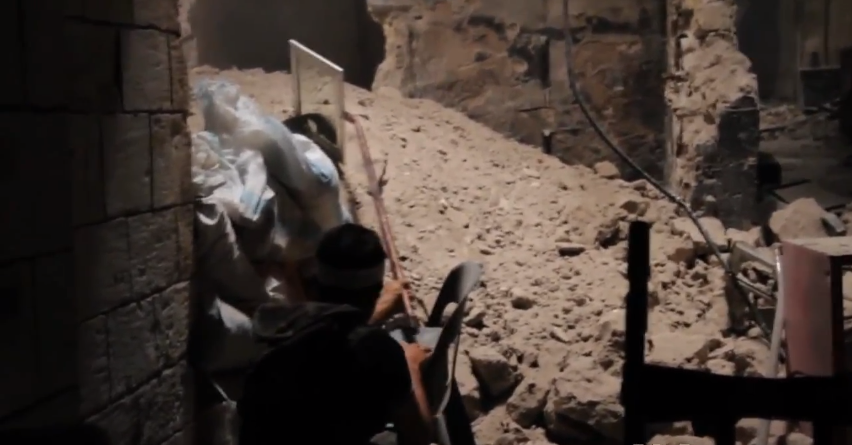
To avoid and spot snipers, a FSA fighter uses a mirror to see around corners in the Old City in Aleppo.

On 5 October, state-run Syrian TV said that government forces "cleansed Sakhur of terrorists and mercenaries." After days of fighting, an Associated Press correspondent said that the rebels lost control of several buildings in Saif al-Dawla, after close-quarter combat.

Meanwhile, rebel fighters claimed to have made advances in the strategic district of Salaheddine, claiming that they had taken the square, lost it and then retaken it after a lengthy battle.

An AFP correspondent reported intense street battles in Arkub district. The insurgents had occupied health facilities and schools as makeshift bases. There were signs of strain from troops, with one officer admitting "the battle for Arkub is as tough as the struggle for Hanano" last month. One soldier said he had not returned home once, to Homs, in three months. The neighborhoods of Bustan al-Qasr, Halak and Haydariya were bombed by Army forces.

On 6 October, Syrian state television said that four Turks were among a group of foreign fighters that the army had killed there. Iranian Press TV claimed that the Army had captured the Shakhur district, but the FSA said they repulsed the assault after heavy clashes.

On 9 October 2012, the FSA captured Maarat al-Numaan. The strategic town lies on the Syria's M5 highway, the main supply route used by the Syrian Army to send supplies and reinforcement from Hama and Damascus to Aleppo, a city under fire between the Army and rebel forces.

An AFP correspondent said that the Syrian Air Force was continuously bombing the Bab al-Hadid, Arkub and Sha'ar neighborhoods that surrounded the besieged Hanano barracks. Locals called it the worst fighting since the battle began. The BBC found a cache of ammunition manufactured in Ukraine and addressed to the Saudi Arabian Army. The ammunition was stored in a mosque used by the rebels. Saudi and Qatari were suspected of supplying ammunition to the rebels but not heavier weapons, such as anti-aircraft missiles, due to American concerns about extremists obtaining such equipment.

On 9 October, rebels claimed control of the strategic town of Maarat al-Numan, a town on the Aleppo-Damascus highway from where many of the Army's reinforcements were joining the battle. Seizing the town was believed to be part of a campaign to isolate the Syrian Army.

On 10 October, rebels launched an attack against the Great Mosque of Aleppo where government forces were based. During four hours of fighting rebels tried to blast holes in the walls of the mosque with RPGs before storming the site but were repelled, leaving rebel snipers to attack the government forces. They had launched an earlier attack against the mosque on 8 October but government forces in the Citadel thwarted them.

The government bombarded the districts of Haydariya, Sukkari and Fardous at dawn, as fierce fighting broke out in Sakhur, Suleiman al-Halabi and Sheikh Khodr districts. One hospital in a rebel area admitted 100 patients a day with less than 10 doctors. Veterinarians were used in some cases given a shortage of human doctors.

On 12 October, rebel forces seized an air defense base east of the city, near al-Tana village and Koris military airport, on the road east of Aleppo to Raqqa. After the capture, government airstrikes destroyed most of the rockets and radars at the base. By the end of the day, the rebels were preparing to withdraw, fearing more strikes.

On 13 October, a large explosion struck the Air Force Intelligence Directorate office followed by heavy clashes. The Directorate is considered important given Hafez al-Assad's role as commander of the Syrian Air Force in the 1960s. Rebels also broke into the Great Mosque of Aleppo by using an explosive charge to attack government forces stationed there.

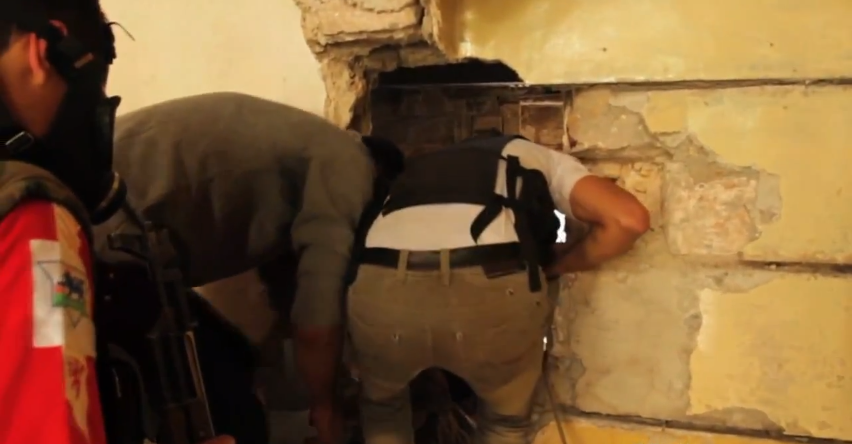
To avoid Syrian Army soldiers, Free Syrian Army fighters in Aleppo use tunnels to travel between buildings.

On 14 October, the Great Mosque of Aleppo was set on fire after Army forces withdrew from it the previous day. Rebels destroyed the southern entrance to get direct access into the internal yard. Later, it was confirmed that the Army's counterattack recaptured the mosque. The mosque sustained the most damage since an 1822 earthquake struck.

A MiG fighter, believed to be a MiG-23, was shot down on 15 October. The pilot ejected and was taken prisoner by rebel forces.

On 21 October, "a suicide car bomber" caused a blast in the New Syriac quarter wounding several people and damaging the Syrian-French hospital and al-Kalima school.

== October rebel offensive, Kurdish-Rebel fighting ==
On 25 October 2012, some 200 rebels moved into the Kurdish-controlled Ashrafiyeh district. It was the first time that substantial government or rebel forces moved into Kurdish areas. The area had been regarded as neutral, with Kurdish militia clashing so far with both rebel and Army units. The rebel unit responsible was allegedly the Tawhid Brigade, who reportedly told the locals that ""We are here to spend Eid with you." Ashrafiyeh is important as a part of the city heights and controls routes between the north and south of Aleppo. Previous rebel attempts to move into the district had been repelled. Rebels were reported to have taken control of the Syriac quarter.

Analyst Joshua Landis said that according to reports he had received, the Syrian Army had retreated from Aleppo's center, allowing the FSA to control the central Christian neighborhoods of Jdeydeh and Qadimeh. The claims were unverified due to a lack of reporters on the ground. Locals from the Armenian district of Zuhur said that the FSA had entered their district, leading to clashes.

An aide to colonel Riad al-Asaad confirmed the reports of the FSA's recent advances and claimed that the rebels captured the Salaheddine district. The spokesman of the Shabhah Brigade claimed that the FSA had limited the Syrian Army to five districts. It was unclear whether the rebels had the strength to hold the new areas and there were indications that the rebels had been forced out of some areas by late afternoon, with one resident saying that the government forces were fighting fiercely.

On 25 October, one FSA fighter told The Guardian that their main focus was on security branches the Syrian Army used as bases. He said that rebels were in the process of besieging the Midan security branch and stopped Army reinforcements from getting to the police school in Khan al-Asal district which had been under FSA siege for 10 days. The fighter claimed that the Ashrafiyeh take-over by the rebels was the result of a deal with the PKK.

SANA said that the Army had recaptured the Syrian-French Hospital. Some rebels believed that the increased talk of a truce from the Syrian government was an effort to stop rebel gains and to use the four days of Eid to reinforce their forces.

Later, a rebel commander claimed that the FSA were fighting in Arkub, Seryan, Furqan and Zahraa districts and had secured Suleiman al-Halabi district. Local activists claimed fierce clashes were occurring around the airport and that rebels were trying to besiege the Nairab Base just south of the city. The center of Aleppo was reported to be in rebel hands with snipers in positions to block counterattacks. The retreat from the city center was seen as either a government trap or signs that the rebel tactic of attacking the government's supply lines was working. Another question was whether the government was prepared to bomb Christian and Kurdish areas, like other rebel-held areas in the past, and risk dragging them into the rebel camp. Rebels who had taken the predominantly Christian areas, among them Jdeydeh, where Lawrence of Arabia once stayed, reported intimidation by the rebels, who feared retaliation from both sides in the conflict. The rebels also claimed to have had encircled the Citadel of Aleppo.

Rebel activists claimed that Kurdish forces had either reached agreement with rebels to allow their rapid advance or assisted the rebels by simply leaving their checkpoints overnight. One rebel spokesman claimed that Kurdish forces might join the Free Syrian Army.

It was reported that government tanks moved into King Faisal Street, the main thoroughfare running the length of the Christian districts of Jdeydeh and Qadimeh, forcing the rebels to make a tactical retreat back into the Kurdish Ashrafiyeh district. The tanks positioned themselves at Ashrafiyeh district the next day, leading some to fear the possibility of the district being shelled, although the tanks did not open fire. However, Kurdish activists claimed that army howitzers shelled Ashrafiyeh, leaving 15 people dead, including 8 Kurds. Two journalists were among the 15 people wounded in the attack. Kurdish activists also accused the Syrian government of shelling Kurdish buses that were coming from Afrin to Aleppo earlier in the month, causing 15 deaths and 19 injuries.

On 26 October, the Syrian authorities accused rebels of breaking the Eid truce. SANA said that rebels opened fire on the Army in several places while the Army responded with fire as well inflicting "heavy losses" upon the rebels. Midday, rebels tried to overrun a checkpoint near the Mohasab Army Base in the northeast Seryan district. Meanwhile, AFP reported that the Syrian Army was guarding the entrance to the Old City. It was also reported that government troops had expelled rebels from the Armenian area of Zuhur.

Rebels clashed with Kurdish militias that tried to stop them entering the Sheikh Maqsood neighbourhood. 19 rebels and 5 Kurdish fighters were killed. One Kurdish leader said that they had "a gentlemen's agreement" with the rebels that they would not enter Kurdish areas and that the rebels had violated it when they entered Ashrafiyeh. According to a report by activists who organised a Kurdish protest at a PYD militant checkpoint between the Kurdish areas of Ashrafiyeh and Sheikh Maqsood, rebel fighters opened fire on the protesters, leaving 8 dead and 5 wounded. Overall, PYD stated that 10 Kurds were killed during the clashes, including 3 fighters. SOHR put the Kurdish toll at 11, for a total of 30 dead, when including the 19 rebels. 200 people were kidnapped or captured as a result of the fighting. The PYD captured 20 rebel fighters, while the rebels detained 180 Kurds, civilians and fighters. SOHR said that the PYD was still in control of the Ashrafiyeh neighbourhood. A later PYD statement blamed both the Syrian Army and the FSA for the violence. "We have chosen to remain neutral, and we will not take sides in a war that will only bring suffering and destruction to our country," the statement said. The rebels said that the clashes started after their forces attacked a security compound in Ashrafiyeh, which was defended by both PKK fighters and government troops. A new report, several days later, put the combatant death toll at 30 rebels and 15 PYD fighters.

On 27 October, SANA said that the rebels attacked the water pumping station in Suleiman al-Halabi neighbourhood, cutting water from the western part of the city. Rebels were accused of kidnapping Lebanese TV journalist Fidaa Itani because his coverage was considered "not suitable" for "the Syrian revolution and revolutionaries". He was later freed by the rebels and left for Turkey.

Rebels fanning out west of Aleppo were besieging the Zahraa Air Force Intelligence Base and came under fire from the Ramouseh Artillery Base which they assaulted from the south. A rebel spokesperson claimed that the Zahraa and Ramouseh military bases were crucial for the regime's defenses given their lack of manpower.

In a new round of clashes in the Kurdish areas, rebels opened fire on Kurdish protesters, killing three of them.

The battle for the Zahraa Air Force Intelligence Base was complicated by the possible presence of civilian prisoners.

== Rebel capture of bases and fighting in West ==
On 1 November 2012, a bakery was bombed in the town of Atarib, killing at least 12 people. The bakery was important since it delivered bread to 40 towns near Aleppo. The government bombed three other bakeries in and around Aleppo at the town of Kafr Hamrah and Ramoon and Qadi Askar districts of the city. These three bakeries were responsible for most of the bread in the area.

On 2 November, SOHR incorrectly reported the execution of Shah Ali Abdo, also known as Nujin Derik, the Kurdish militia leader for Aleppo, whom the rebels captured while she was on a mission to return the bodies of rebel fighters killed during the clashes between the FSA and the Kurdish militia. She commanded a unit responsible for protecting the Kurdish districts of Ashrafiyeh and Sheikh Maqsood. The report later proved to be false.

On 5 November, clashes occurred at a roundabout in Zahraa district, near the city's northwest entrance, and on the road to the airport. In Zahraa a fire started in a building close to the Air Force Intelligence Base. The Syrian Arab Red Crescent reported that a fire had burnt down its main warehouse, destroying supplies needed for the upcoming winter. Fighting was reported near the airport.

On 11 November, fighting was reported for the first time in the northwest Layramoun neighbourhood. SANA claimed that the Syrian Army took the Sheikh Saeed area. During the day, the Army pounded rebel positions in the northern area. Rebels began using 'barrel bombs' similar to those dropped on rebel areas by the Syrian Air Force in an attack on an Army's position in the eastern Karm al-Jabal district. They rolled through the sewers underneath the guardpost before being detonated.

On 17 November, a car bomb exploded in Layramoun. The Syrian Army and the rebels continued to fight in the northwest.

On 18 November, rebels stormed the home base of the 46th Regiment in nearby Urum al-Sughra, securing the base the following day in a key strategic victory following a two-month siege. The fall of Base 46 has further isolated government troops fighting in Aleppo as well as in Idlib Province, while simultaneously providing the rebels with secure supply routes from the Turkish border and much-needed ammunition and heavy weaponry. The nearby Army Base 111 at Sheikh Suleiman site remained in government hands, though rebel forces had stepped up their attacks on it in the aftermath of Base 46's capture.

On 22 November, a building next to a major Aleppo hospital was targeted by an airstrike that killed at least 15 people according to the SOHR, including 11 rebels, a doctor and three children. The Dar al-Shifa Hospital was a private clinic before it was turned into a field hospital by opposition forces. It has been targeted at least six times in recent months, mainly affecting the upper floors of the seven-story high building. Only 400–500 yards from the front line, it is in a heavily shelled area and one of the few remaining medical clinics for residents in Aleppo.

On 26 November, rebels claimed to control most of the roads to Aleppo, leaving the Damascus-Aleppo highway as the only supply route to government forces in the city.

On 27 November, rebels shot down a Syrian military helicopter on the outskirts of Aleppo using a surface-to-air missile.

On 28 November, the situation in the city's centre was calm with shootings and explosions being heard in the Armenian New Village neighbourhood.

It was reported in December that the Bustan al-Basha neighbourhood had been shelled, while the clashes were ongoing on the airport road. On 3 December, clashes were reported in Midan and the nearby Suleiman al-Halabi districts, while government forces shelled villages near the Ground Forces Academy. Activists reported that five bodies had been found in Al-Soufayra. However, fierce combat soon broke out within Bustan al-Basha district, held by the Islamist Al-Nusra Front and Ahrar al-Sham, according to a military source. The Syrian Army advanced from Midan, taking control of the main avenue and reaching Zahi Hospital in Halak neighbourhood. Islamists continued to hold the side streets and fighting was ongoing.

Early in December, the chemical plant SYSACCO, 29 kilometers (18 mi) east of Aleppo, was taken by rebel fighters from Al-Nusra Front. The factory produces liquid chlorine among other chemicals.

On 5 December, Morocco's honorary consul, Mohamed Alae Eddinne, and another man were killed by a group of armed men when Eddinne tried to leave a hotel in Aleppo.

On 10 December, the Army's Base 111 at Sheikh Suleiman was overrun by opposition forces. A hundred Army soldiers who were left inside the base retreated to the scientific building wearing gas masks. Al-Nusra Front led the attack with only one FSA group taking part, one FSA commander said. Many of the fighters were from Central Asia with the rebel commander coming from Uzbekistan.

On 15 December, Colonel Yusef al-Jader, former Army officer, defector and top rebel commander for the Tawhid Brigade, was killed in action during an assault on the military academy located near Muslimiyeh, around 10 km north of Aleppo. Al-Jader, also known as Abu Furat, was said to be suspicious of the growing jihadist presence in the war and sought to "keep Jabhat al-Nusra at bay". SOHR reported that rebels had captured large parts of the academy, while Republican Guard troops were deployed by helicopter to the base in a counterattack.

Eventually, on 16 December, the rebel Tawhid Brigade took control of the academy, an Army's Infantry School in a campus of around 3 square kilometres (1.2 mi^{2}), after three weeks of fighting. At least 24 rebels and 20 government soldiers were killed in the fighting. The remaining government troops withdrew from the base and regrouped near the prison at Muslimiyeh and Al-Kindi Hospital in the Palestinian refugee neighbourhood of Handarat, which had been captured from the rebels on 14 December. However, they remained encircled by opposition forces.

During the fighting the price of bread rose from $0.35 (USD) to $3 for a bag of 8 loaves.

== Battles in Aleppo and on its outskirts ==
Beginning in late 2012, fighting intensified around the area of the airport. Al-Nusra Front unilaterally declared a no-fly zone in December and threatened to shoot down commercial aircraft, alleging that the government was using them to transport loyalist troops and military supplies. After multiple attacks on Aleppo International Airport, all flights were suspended on 1 January 2013. Rebels attacked loyalist troops at the airport perimeter, including the nearby 80th Brigade. By mid-February 2013, at least 150 people had died in this fighting.
