= Shifa =

Shifa may refer to:

== Medicine ==
- The Book of Healing (Kitāb al-Shifāʾ; "al-Shifa" or "Shifa" for short), an 11th-century Persian encyclopedia
- Al-Shifa (disambiguation), also rendered as 'El-Shifa' or 'Shifa'
- Shifa Hospital (disambiguation)
- Shifa College of Medicine, Islamabad, Pakistan

== People ==
=== Given name ===
- Al-Shifa' bint Abdullah, a companion of Muhammad
- Shifa Gwaliori (1912–1968), Urdu poet
- Shifa Zikri Ibrahim (1986–2017), Kurdish journalist
- Shifa Mohamed, Maldivian politician
- Shifa Thaufeeq (born 1970), Maldivian singer

=== Surname ===
- Cheng Shifa (程十髮; 1921–2007), Chinese calligrapher, cartoonist, painter
- Mariyam Shifa (born 1999), Maldivian actress

== Other uses ==
- Al Shifa Sub-Municipality, Riyadh, Saudi Arabia
- Shifa Pharmed, an Iranian industrial group
