= Al-Shifa (disambiguation) =

Al-Shifāʾ (الشفاء), sometimes ash-Shifa, is the Arabic for healing.

It may refer to:

- Al-Shifa' bint Abdullah, a companion of Muhammad
- Dār al-shifāʾ, house of healing, a hospital

- Al-Shifa Hospital in Gaza
- Al-Shifa pharmaceutical factory, active in Khartoum between 1997 and 1998

- Kitab al-Shifa, Book of Healing

- The Book of Healing by Avicenna
- Al-Shifa bi Ta'rif Huquq al-Mustafa by Qadi Ayyad
- Kitab al-Shifa by Ibn al-Rāhib

- Ash-Shifa School, Banbury, Oxfordshire, England, UK
- Al Shifa Sub-Municipality, Riyadh, Saudi Arabia

== See also ==
- Shifa Hospital (disambiguation), including al-Shifa hospitals
- Shifa (disambiguation)
