= Al Masani (Riyadh) =

Village-turned neighbourhood in southern Riyadh, Saudi Arabia

Al-Masaniʽ حي المصانع
- Neighbourhood
- Souq Haraj in al-Masani, 2022

- Location within Saudi Arabia Location within Asia
- Coordinates: 24°34′34″N 46°44′2″E
- Country: Saudi Arabia
- City: Riyadh

Government
  - Body: Baladiyah Al Shifa

Language
  - Official: Arabic

Al-Masani (Arabic: المصانع, romanized: al-maṣāniʿ, lit. 'industrial plants') is a historic neighborhood and a former town in southern Riyadh, Saudi Arabia, situated south of Manfuhah in the sub-municipality of al-Shifa. The neighborhood traces its origins to an ancient agricultural village that served as a confluence of Wadi Hanifa and Wadi al-Batʼha and was known for its cultivation of palm groves in al-Yamama during pre-Islamic Arabia. It was also mentioned in Yaqut al-Hamawi's 13th century work Kitāb Mu'jam al-Buldān (transl. Dictionary of Countries). It was incorporated into the burgeoning metropolis of Riyadh during the city's multiple phases of urbanization and expansion in the 1950s and 1970s.

Masani was also a site of conflict in 1837 when Imam Faisal's forces clashed with the Ottomans and the forces of its Riyadh-based vassal emirate during the former's attempt to regain control of the region.
