= Bab al-Nasr =

Bab al-Nasr may refer to:

- Bab al-Nasr (Aleppo), Syria
- Bab al-Nasr (Cairo), Egypt
