= Shifa Hospital =

Shifa Hospital may refer to:

- al-Shifa Hospital, Rimal, Gaza City, Gaza Governorate, Gaza Strip
  - Al-Shifa ambulance airstrike (2023)
  - Al-Shifa Hospital siege (2023 and 2024)
- PNS Shifa Hospital, Karachi, Sindh, Pakistan; a Pakistan Navy hospital
- Shifa International Hospital (Islamabad), Pakistan
- Al-Shifa Trust Eye Hospital, Rawalpindi, Punjab, Pakistan; see List of hospitals in Pakistan
- Al Shifa Hospital, Chakri Road, Pindi, Rawalpindi, Punjab, Pakistan; see List of hospitals in Punjab, Pakistan

== See also ==
- Dar al-Shifa Hospital, Aleppo, Syria; see Combat operations in 2012 during the Battle of Aleppo
- Noor al Shifa Medical Complex, Thumarit, Oman; see List of hospitals in Oman
- Al-Shifa (disambiguation)
- Shifa (disambiguation)
