= Al-Hayir =

al-H̨āyir الحاير
- Location within Saudi Arabia
- Coordinates: 25.79°N 45.38°E
- Country: Saudi Arabia
- Province: Riyadh Province

Population (2004)
  - Total: 13,473
- Time zone: UTC+3 (EAT)
  - Summer (DST): UTC+3 (EAT)

al-H̨āyir, Al Ha'ir, Ha'ir or Hayer (Arabic: الحائر or الحاير) is a small town in Riyadh Province, Saudi Arabia. It is located 208 kilometres (129 mi) by road northwest of Riyadh, in the valley known as Wadi Hanifa. As of the 2004 census it had a population of 13,473 people. The Ha'ir dam serves the area, and it also contains Ha'ir prison.

== See also ==
- List of cities and towns in Saudi Arabia
- Regions of Saudi Arabia
