= Souq Haraj Ibn Qasim =

Flea marketplace in southern Riyadh, Saudi Arabia

- سوق حراج ابن قاسم

- Address: Al-Haʼir Road, al-Masani, Riyadh, Saudi Arabia
- Management: Arriyadh Holding Company
- Website: arhc.com.sa

Souq Haraj Ibn Qasim (Arabic: سوق حراج ابن قاسم), locally pronounced as Haraj bin Gassem, Haraj bin Jassem, or simply Souq Haraj (Arabic: سوق حراج, romanized: sūq ḥarāǧ, lit. 'auction market'), is an outdoor second-hand flea marketplace in the al-Masani neighborhood of southern Riyadh, Saudi Arabia. It is one of the oldest flea markets in the city where largely used furnitures, carpets and other household related appliances are sold and auctioned. It was previously situated in the al-Manfuhah district until 2014 when the Riyadh Municipality relocated the place to further south of al-Batʼha Street, overlooking al-Anoud Park Mall. The place gets flocked mostly by migrant workers during weekends.

== History ==
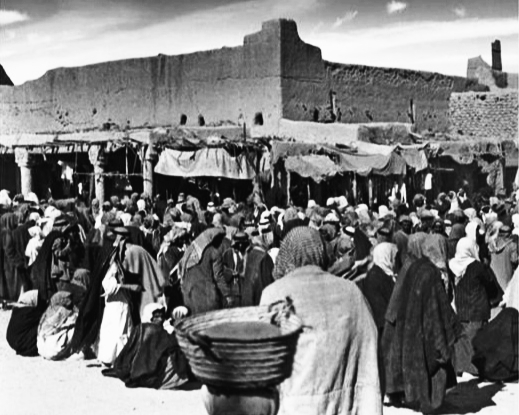
Souq Haraj during the 1950s in the ad-Dirah neighborhood

Haraj bin Qassim has its origins around the 1940s in the Deera Square, in front of present-day Grand Mosque of Riyadh in the city's ad-Dirah neighborhood. It is attributed to a person called ibn Qassim (transl. Son of Qassem), who is believed to be the eponymous founder of the souq after King Abdulaziz granted him the land for setting up an auction market. It was later relocated to al-Batʼha Street in al-Manfuhah neighborhood in 1971. One branch of the souq was also opened in Asir Street and Raʾīs Street, in close proximity to al-Shumaisi neighborhood but was soon closed down as the site was unspecified for the purpose by the authorities. In 2007, the Riyadh Municipality announced that it would be relocating the souq further south of al-Batʼha Street in a 48-hectares area allotted in the al-Masani neighborhood, in close proximity to the al-Mansurah district. The land was donated by Prince Sattam bin Abdulaziz and after conducting a well-planned study of the area, the market was shifted there in 2014.
