= Wadi Hanifa =

Seasonal river in Najd, Riyadh, Saudi Arabia

Coordinates: 24°34′51″N 46°42′47″E

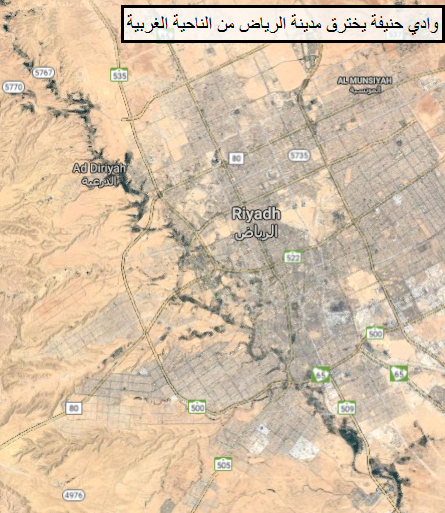
Wadi Hanifa penetrates the city of Riyadh from the west

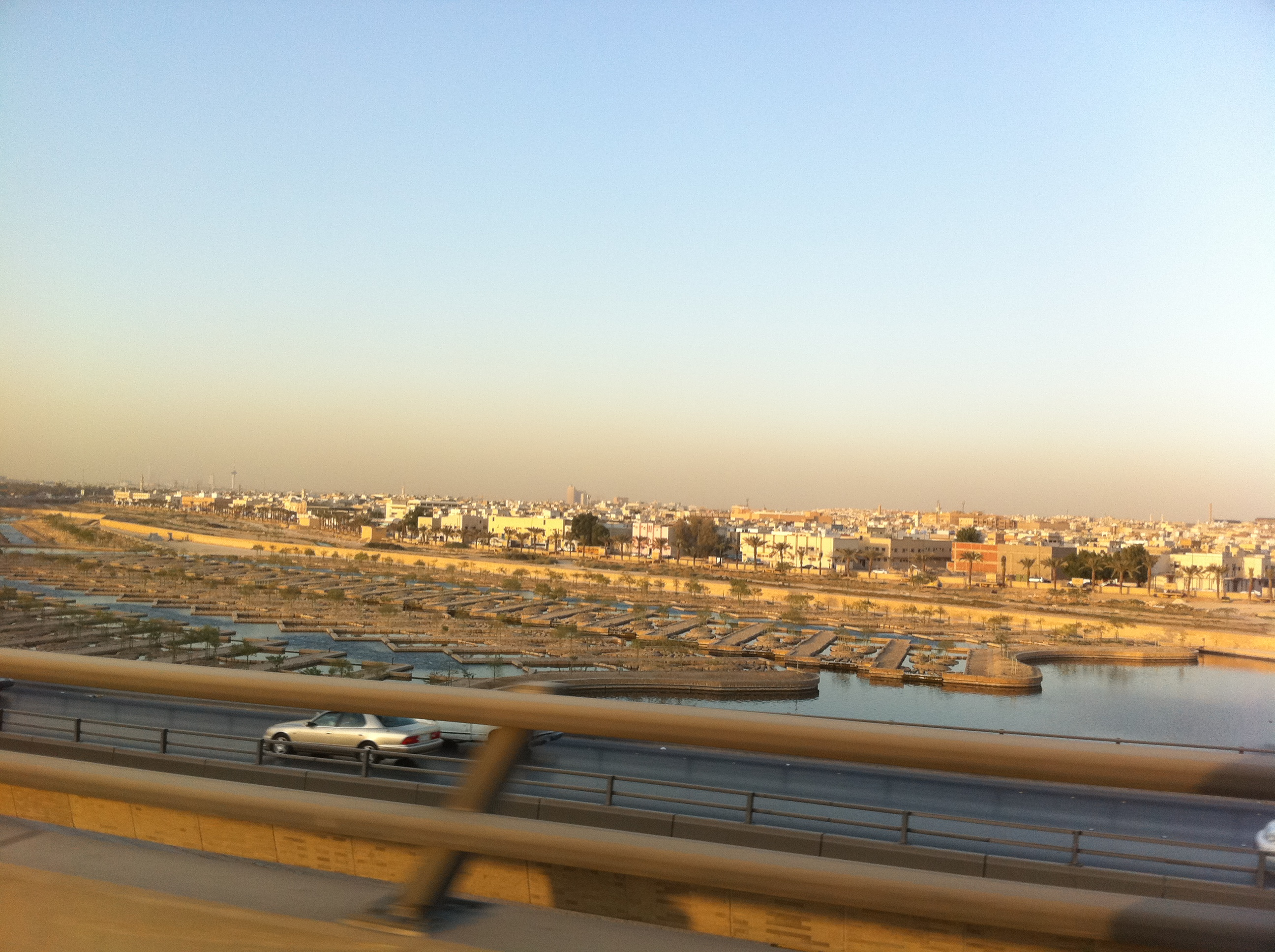
A view of Wadi Hanifa in Riyadh from King Fahd Road

Wadi Hanifa (Arabic: وَادِي حَنِيْفَة, romanized: Wādī Ḥanīfah), historically known as Wadi al-Arad, is a wadi (seasonal river) in the Najd region, Riyadh Province, in central Saudi Arabia. The valley runs for a length of 120 km (75 mi) from northwest to southeast, cutting through the city of Riyadh, the capital of Saudi Arabia. A string of towns and villages lie along the valley, including Uyaynah, Irqah and Diriyah. The historical city of Riyadh itself is on the northeastern side of the wadi, but the city has now expanded across Wadi Hanifa, with the sub-municipalities of Al-Shifa and Al-Urayja on its southwestern side.

== History ==
In ancient times, the wadi was known as al-Irdh (العرض). Its current name is derived from that of the Banu Hanifa, the principal Arab tribe in the area at the time of the Islamic conquest of Arabia.

In pre-historic times, rain fell heavily in the region. This is reflected in the local folk tradition that claims that during the reign of the ancient kingdom of Al-Yamamah, the area was once covered with oases and fertile farmland.

== Climate ==
Temperatures in summer reach an average of 42.9 °C (109.2 °F), and precipitation averages only 60 millimetres (2.4 in) per year in the driest places. Rain falls with great intensity for short periods, causing flash floods. The nature of the dry, warm climate leads to a high percentage of the scarce rainfall being instantly evaporated. That which remains mostly ends up as groundwater. While abundant, the levels of the water table are being tested by the rapid growth the city of Riyadh has seen in the past fifty years, from a population of 150,000 in 1960 to an estimated 5 million today.

== Development ==
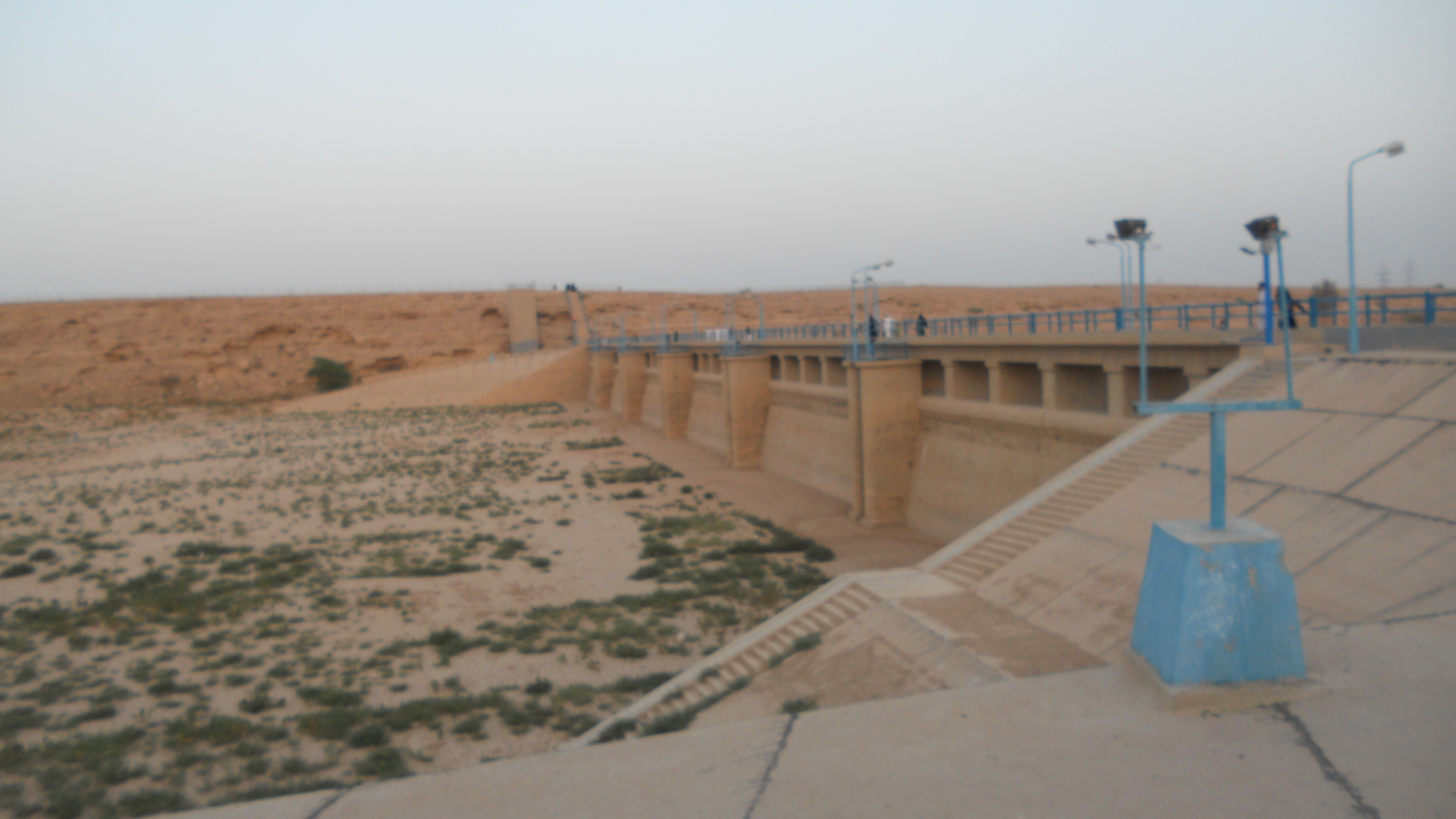
Al-Elb Dam in Diriya Riyadh. It is a part of Wadi Haneefa Project.

2015

== See also ==
- List of wadis of Saudi Arabia
- Tuwaiq
- Manfuha
- Al-Hayir
