= Sabaa Bahrat Square, Aleppo =

City square in Aleppo, Syria

Sabaa Bahrat Square
- City square
- {{{other_names}}}
- ساحة السبع بحرات
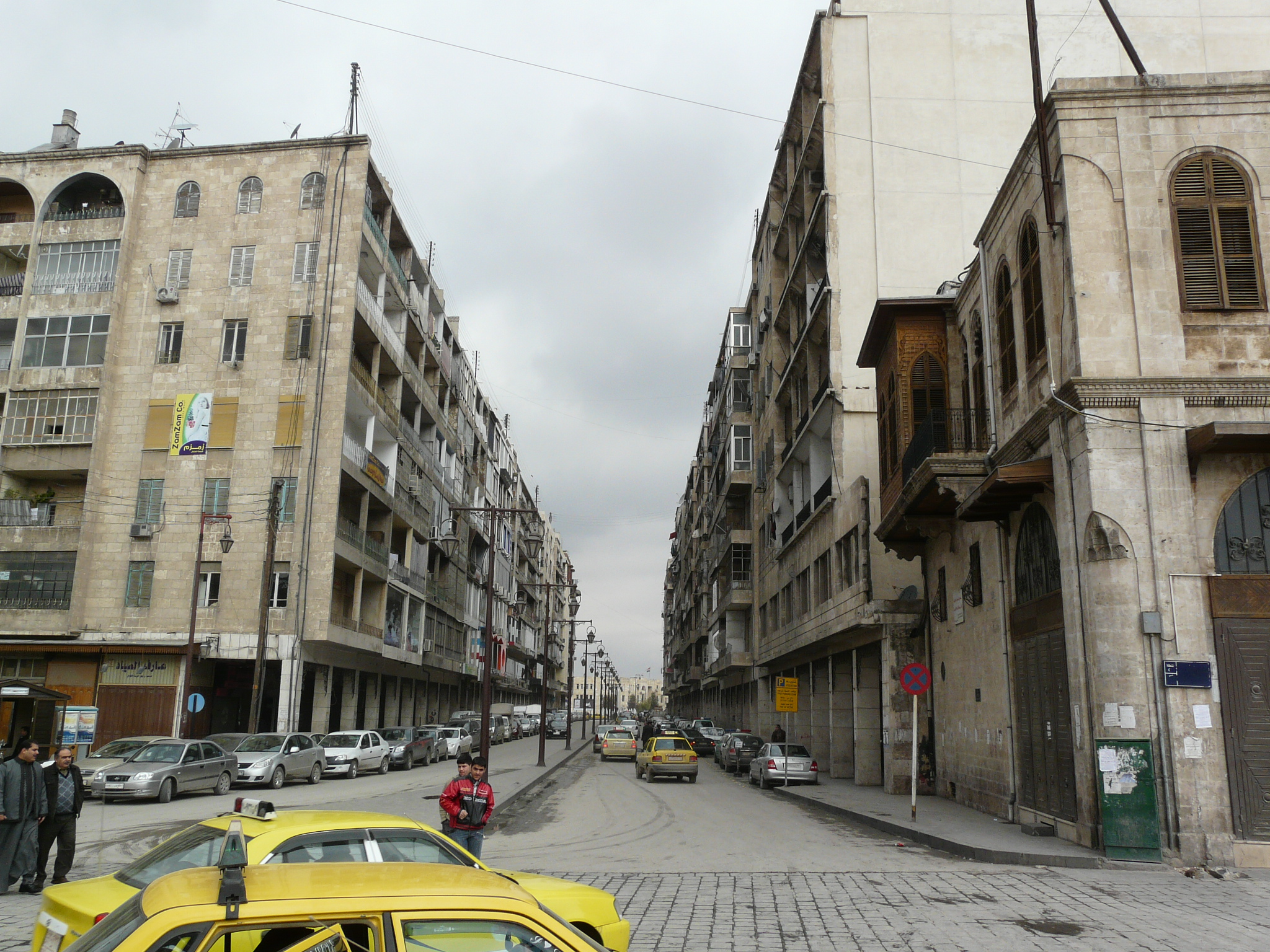
- Abdel Menem Riyad street ends up with Sabaa Bahrat square
- Owner: City of Aleppo
- Location: Aleppo, Syria
- Location in Aleppo
- Coordinates: 36°12′07″N 37°09′21″E

Sabaa Bahrat Square (Arabic: ساحة السبع بحرات) (Square of the Seven Fountains) is one of the most important squares in Aleppo, Syria. Located at the intersection of Abdel Menem Riyad street with Al-Mutanabbi street within the ancient part of the city, the square is an important junction between the old city and modern Aleppo.

Many important official buildings are located around the square, including the Aleppo Chamber of Industry, Coral Julia Dumna Hotel and the main entrance of Souq Al-Suweiqa; one of the largest covered markets of the old city.

The main Aleppo branches of the local banks are situated along the Al-Mutanabbi street, up to the Sabaa Bahrat square. Abdel Menem Riyad street is home to the main offices of many Syrian political parties as well as to the 16th century mansion of Dar Rajab Pasha. The square is the main route towards the Great Mosque of Aleppo.

The centre of the square is decorated with colourful dancing fountains.

The Northwest side has the destroyed Great Synagogue of Aleppo which stood their for very many centuries.

== Gallery ==
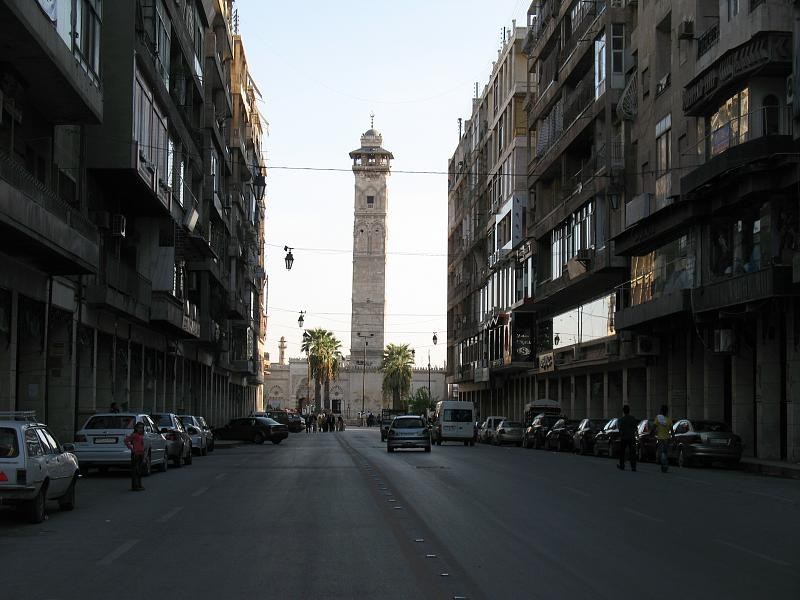
The Great Mosque as seen from Sabaa Bahrat square through A. M. Riyad street
