= Salaheddine District =

Salaheddine District حَيّ صَلَاحُ الدِّين
- District
- Location of Salaheddine District within Syria
- Coordinates: 36°11′15″N 37°7′11″E
- Country: Syria
- City: Aleppo

Area
  - Total: 1.5 km^{2} (0.58 sq mi)

Population (2004)
  - Total: 62,932
  - Density: 42,000/km^{2} (110,000/sq mi)
- Time zone: UTC+2 (EET)
  - Summer (DST): UTC+3 (EEST)

Salaheddine District (Arabic: حَيّ صَلَاحُ الدِّين, romanized: Ḥayy Ṣalāḥu d-Dīn) is a district in the southern part of the city of Aleppo, Syria. The district was named after Saladin, the Muslim leader who defeated the Crusaders in the 12th century. The district gained international attention during the Battle of Aleppo in July 2012 as it became a hotly contested battleground between the Syrian Armed Forces and the Free Syrian Army.

The Aleppo International Stadium and the Al-Hamadaniah Stadium are located in the Salaheddine district.

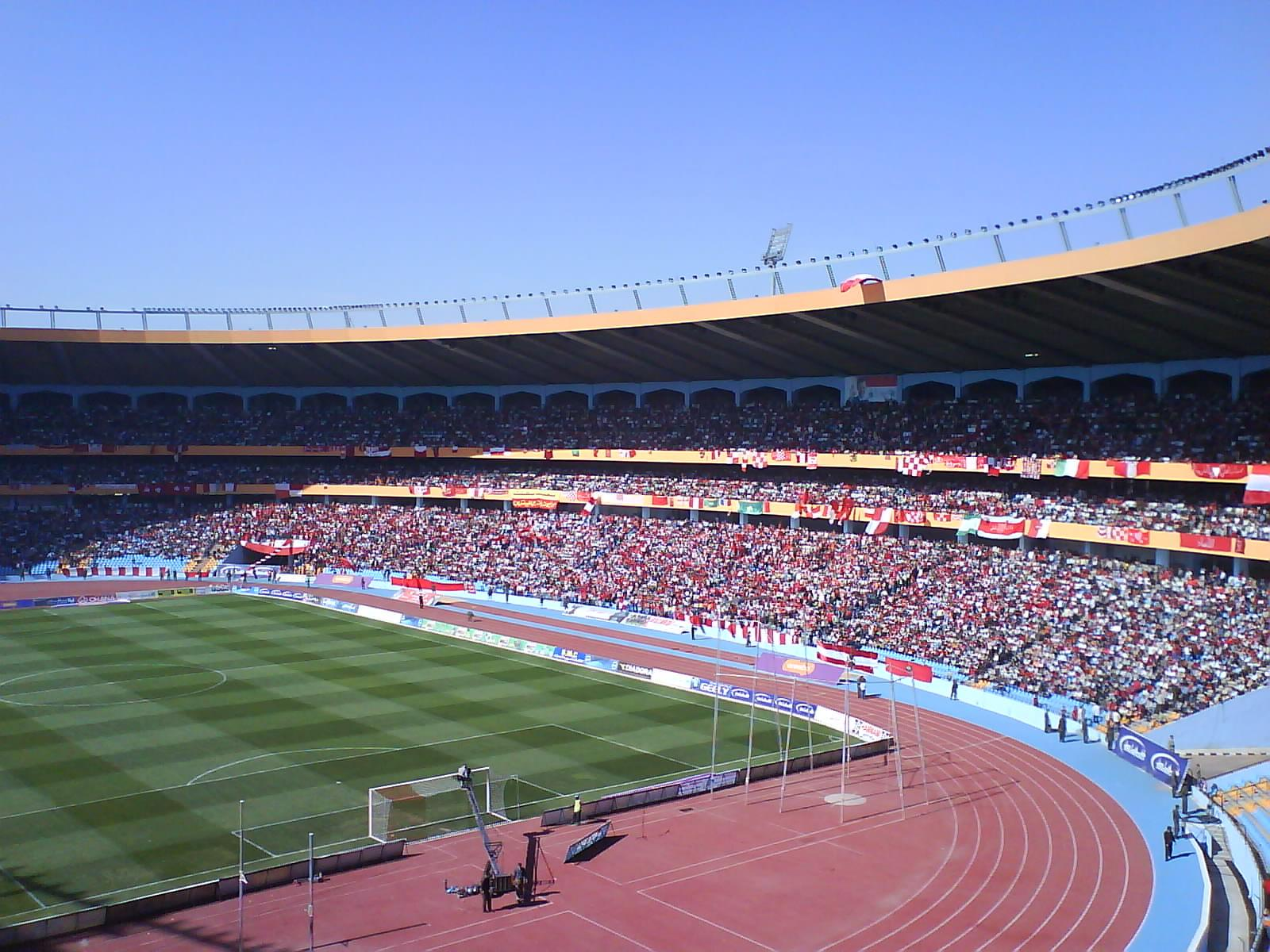
Aleppo International Stadium
