= SYSACCO =

Syrian-Saudi chemical company

Coordinates: 36.178511°N 37.486662°E

- Industry: Chemical industry
- Headquarters: Aleppo, Syria
- Products: Caustic Soda; Liquid Chlorine; Sodium hypochlorite Hydrochloric Acid
- Owner: Mohammad Sabbagh
- Website: www.sysacco.net www.facebook.com/SYSACCO

SYSACCO is a Syrian-Saudi Chemical Company with headquarter in Aleppo, Syria. Their chemical plant with an area of 142,000 m^{2} is located 29 kilometers (18 mi) east of Aleppo. SYSACCO is Syria’s only chlorine manufacturing plant.

== Products ==
They mostly produce products for water sterilization to the local market:

- Sodium hydroxide, also known as Caustic Soda.
- Chlorine gas cylinders.
- Sodium hypochlorite, the sodium salt of hypochlorous acid.
- Hydrochloric Acid, a clear, colorless, highly pungent solution of hydrogen chloride in water.
