= Bab al-Nasr (Aleppo) =

Coordinates: 36°12′14″N 37°09′38″E

- بَاب النَّصْر
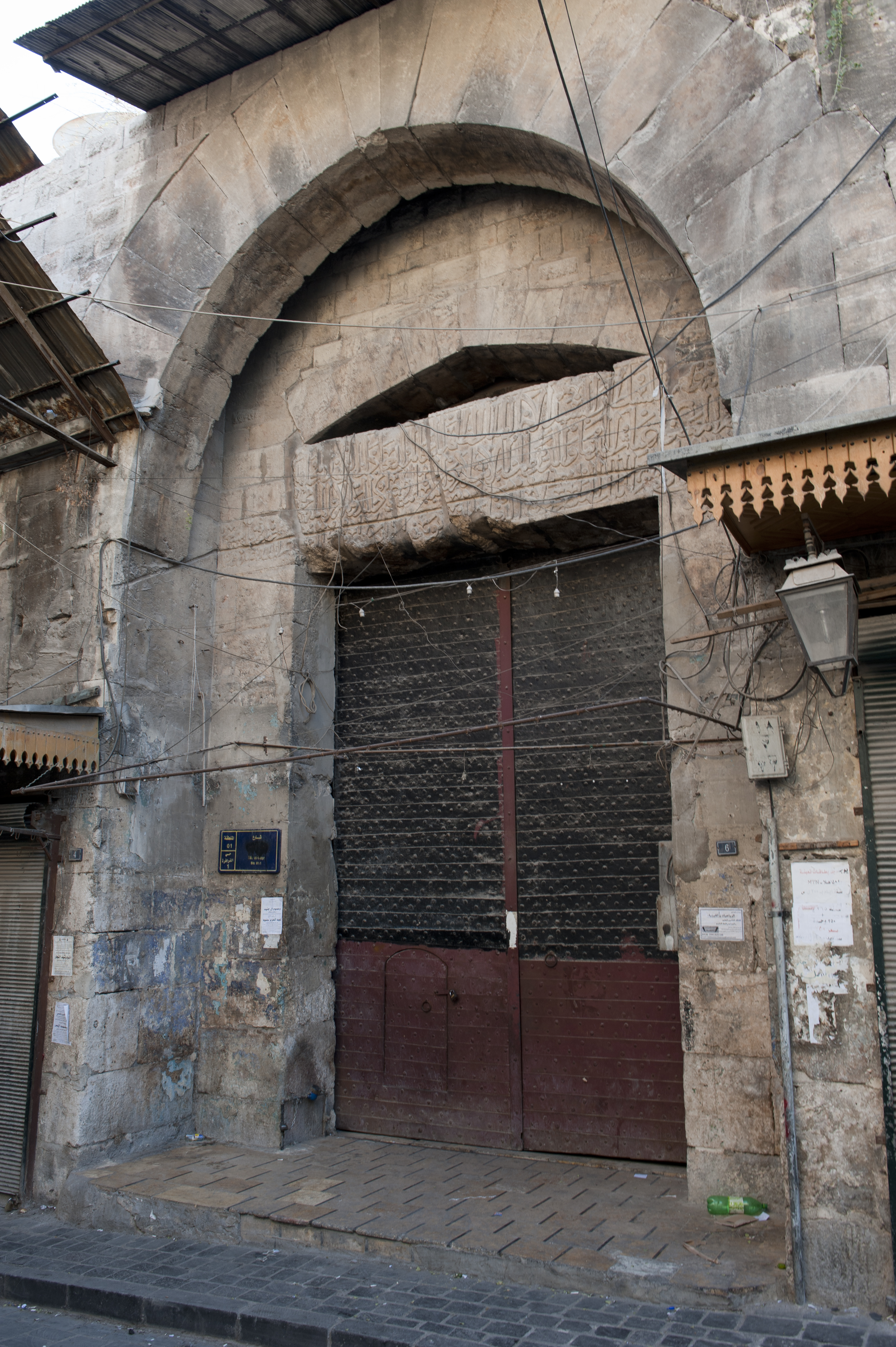
- Bab al-Nasr in 2010
- Interactive map of Bab al-Nasr
- Alternative names: Gate of Victory

General information
- Status: restored
- Type: City gate
- Architectural style: Islamic architecture
- Location: Aleppo, Syria
- Completed: 1212
- Renovated: 2018
- Owner: Az-Zahir Ghazi
- Known for: One of the 9 main gates of the ancient city walls of Aleppo

Bab al-Nasr (Arabic: بَاب النَّصْر, romanized: Bāb an-Naṣr) meaning the Gate of Victory, is one of the nine historical gates of the Ancient City of Aleppo, Syria.

It was rebuilt and renamed by az-Zahir Ghazi in 1212 in became the most important northern gate of the city.

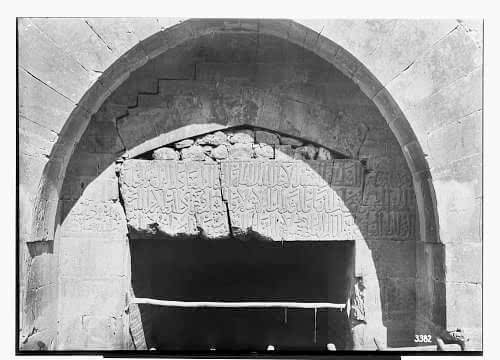
Historical image of the Bab al Nasr Gate of Aleppo

The structure was partially modified during Ottoman times and its role affected by mid-20th-century French urban planners.

The gate received "moderate" damage during the Syrian civil war and restored by local committee in 2018.
