= Al-Shifa' bint Abdullah =

Companion of Muhammad

Al-Shifāʾ bint ʿAbd Allāh (Arabic: الشفاء بنت عبد الله), whose given name was Laylā, was a companion of the Islamic prophet Muhammad.

== Biography ==
She was the daughter of Abdullah ibn Abdshams and Fatima bint Wahb and a member of the Adi clan of the Quraysh in Mecca. She married Sharhabeel bin Habib, and they had two sons, Sulayman and Masruq.

She had a reputation as a wise woman. Her by-name Al-Shifaa means "the Healer, " indicating that she practiced folk medicine. At a time when barely twenty people in Mecca could read and write, Al-Shifaa was the first woman to acquire this skill. She taught calligraphy to many others, including, her relative, Hafsa bint Umar, and the two women remained friends.

Al-Shifaa became a Muslim in Mecca and was among the first to join the emigration to Medina. There she had a house between the mosque and the market. Muhammad visited her there and sometimes consulted her about best practices in business matters.

It was narrated that when Umar became caliph, he sometimes would consult her regarding some matters of the marketplace. But this narration is not proven by authentic sources. Shifa would later become the head of Health and Safety in Basra, Iraq. She recalled of him: "When Umar talked, he was loud; when he walked, he was fast; when he beat, he hurt." He also used to visit her in her home. On one occasion he asked why her son Sulayman had been missing from morning prayers; she replied that Sulayman had been praying all night and had given way to sleep in the morning.

== Legacy ==
Among the hadith that she narrated are the origin of Umar's title, Amir al-Muminin, and these words of Muhammad: "'The example of the jihad warrior in the path of Allah is like the one who fasts and prays and does not stop fasting or praying until the jihad warrior returns."

Her son Masruq became an emir. By her son Sulayman she had two grandsons, Abu Bakr and Uthman, who were also narrators of hadith.
