= Al Shifa Sub-Municipality =

Al Shifa Sub-Municipality بلدية الشفا
- Baladiyah
- Country: Saudi Arabia
- City: Riyadh
- Website: shefa.alriyadh.gov.sa

Baladiyah al-Shifa (Arabic: بلدية الشفا), officially the Al-Shifa Sub-Municipality is one of the 16 baladiyahs of Riyadh, Saudi Arabia. It includes 8 neighborhoods and is responsible for their development, planning and maintenance.

== Neighborhoods and districts ==
- Al-Masani
- Al-Shifa
- Badr
- Al-Marwah
- Al-Okaz
- Ahad
- Al-Arayiz
- Al-Mansouriyah
