= Al-Hamadaniah Olympic Swimming and Diving Complex =

Water sports centre in Aleppo, Syria

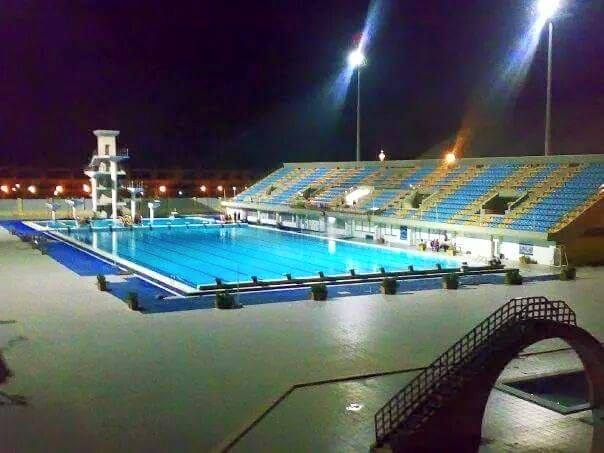
- Interactive map of Al-Hamadaniah Olympic Swimming and Diving Complex
- Location: Aleppo, Syria
- Coordinates: 36°11′18″N 37°07′01″E
- Owner: Government of Syria
- Operator: General Sports Federation of Syria
- Capacity: 1,340

Construction
- Opened: 2009; 17 years ago

Al-Hamadaniah Olympic Swimming and Diving Complex (Arabic: مجمع الحمدانية الأولمبي للسباحة والغطس) is a water sports centre in Aleppo, Syria, featuring an outdoor Olympic size swimming and diving pools with a seating capacity of 1,340 spectators. The complex was opened in 2009, as part of the al-Hamadaniah Sports City.

== Facilities ==
- Current:
  - Outdoor swimming pool with 10 lanes, 25x50 meters.
  - Outdoor diving pool, 15x25 meters, 5.5 meters-deep with a 14 meters-high diving tower.
  - Outdoor children's pool.
