= Nur al-Din =

Nur al-Din (Arabic: نور الدين, romanized: nūr ad-dīn) is a male Arabic given name, translating to 'light of Faith', nūr meaning 'light' and dīn meaning 'religion'. More recently, the name has also been used as a surname.

There are many Romanized spelling variants of the name. The element نور can be spelled Nur, Noor, Nor, Nour or Nuer. The element دين can be spelled either Din, Deen or Dine. The definite article in front of the "sun letter" d is realized only as a gemination /dː/, the Arabic pronunciation being /nuːrudːiːn/.

Syntactically, the name is an iḍāfah (genitive construction), in full vocalization nūru d-dīni. Consequently, depending on the system of Romanization, the definite article can be rendered as al, ad, ud, ed or d.

Among the variant romanized spellings in common use are Nuraddin, Nureddin, Noureddin, Noureddine, Nooradeen, Nordeen, Nourdin, Noordine, Nordine, Nuradin, Nurdin, Nooruldeen; scientific transliterations are Nur ad-Din, Nur-ud-Din, Nur al-Din, etc.

== Given name ==
=== Medieval and up to 1800 ===
- Nur ad-Din, atabeg of Aleppo (1118–1174), member of the Zengid dynasty, ruler of the Syrian province of the Seljuk Empire
- Nur al-Din Muhammad (died 1185), member of the Artuqid dynasty
- Nur ad-Din al-Bitruji (also known as Alpetragius) (died 1204), Arab astronomer and philosopher
- Nur al-Din Arslan Shah I, Zengid emir of Mosul
- Nure Sofi (1197–1257), Turkish religious leader
- Nur al-Din ibn Jaja, 13th-century emir in the Sultanate of Rum
- Nūr ad-Dīn 'Abd al-'Azīz Ibn al-Qamar (1326–1398), Tunisian Berber prince
- Sheikh Noor-ud-din Wali (1377–1440), Kashmiri saint of the rishi order
- Nuruddin Sikandar Shah, Sultan of Bengal
- Nur ad-Din Abd ar-Rahman Jami (1414–1492), Persian poet
- Nur ad-Din Abu al-Hasan Ali ibn Sultan Muhammad al-Hirawi al-Qari, known as Ali al-Qari (died 1605), Afghan Islamic scholar
- Nuruddin ar-Raniri (died 1658), Indian Islamic scholar
- Noor Mohammad Nooruddin (died 1719), Dai-al-Mutlaq (vicegerent) of the Dawoodi Bohra Community
- Nur al-Din Nimatullah al-Jazayiri (1677–1745), Safavid Iranian Ja'fari jurist, linguist and writer
- Hassan Nooraddeen I (died 1799), sultan of the Maldives

=== Born after 1800 ===
- Ibrahim Nooraddeen (died 1892), sultan of the Maldives
- Abdurrahman Nurettin Pasha (1833–1912), Grand Vizier of the Ottoman Empire
- Hakeem Noor-ud-Din (1841–1914), Head of Ahmadiyya Muslim Community
- Nur al-Din al-Salimi (1869–1914), Omani Ibadi scholar
- Nureddin Pasha (1873–1932), Turkish military officer
- Hassan Nooraddeen II, (1887–1967), sultan of the Maldives
- Nureddine Rifai (1899–1980), Lebanese politician
- Münir Nurettin Selçuk (1900–1981), Turkish musician
- Nur al-Din Kahala (1908–1965), Syrian politician
- Noureddin Kianouri (1915–1999), Iranian communist leader of the Tudeh Party
- Nordine Ben Ali (1919–1996), Algerian-French footballer
- Nurettin Ok (1927–2013), Turkish lawyer and politician
- Nureddin al-Atassi (1929–1992), President of Syria
- Noureddine Sammoud (1932–2022), Tunisian poet
- Nuredin Loxha (1935–1992), Kosovar Albanian theatre director
- Noureddin Zarrinkelk (born 1937), Iranian film animator
- Nurettin Sözen (born 1937), Turkish politician
- Noureddine Yazid Zerhouni (1937–2020), Algerian politician
- Nooruddeen Durkee (1938–2020), American Sufi
- Nurettin Yardımcı (born 1944), Turkish archaeologist
- Mohammad Noordin Sopiee (1944–2005), Malaysian academician
- Nuruddin Farah (born 1945), Somali novelist
- Nourredine Kourichi (born 1954), Algerian-French footballer
- Noureddine Bouyahyaoui (born 1955), Moroccan footballer
- Nur-eldeen Masalha (born 1957), Palestinian writer
- Noureddine Bhiri (born 1958), Tunisian politician
- Nourdine Bourhane (born 1958), Prime Minister of Comoros
- Noureddine Melikechi (born 1958), Algerian Physicist and Educator
- Noureddine Daifallah (born 1960), Moroccan calligrapher
- Nurettin Canikli (born 1960), Turkish politician
- Noordeen Mashoor (born 1962), Sri Lankan politician
- Nordin Mohamed Jadi (born 1962), Malaysian athlete
- Nordine Zouareg (born 1962), Algerian fitness coach
- Noor Deen Mi Guangjiang (born 1963), Chinese Muslim calligrapher
- Noureddine Bensouda (born 1963), Moroccan civil servant
- Noordin Mohammad Top (1968–2009), Malaysian-Indonesian Islamist militant
- Noureddine Morceli (born 1970), Algerian athlete
- Noureddine Naybet (born 1970), Moroccan footballer
- Nurettin Demirtaş (born 1972), Turkish politician
- Noureddine Drioueche (born 1973), Algerian footballer
- Noureddine Yagoubi (born 1974), Algerian judoka
- Noureddine Ziyati (born 1974), Moroccan footballer
- Nordin Jbari (born 1975), Moroccan-Belgian footballer
- Noureddine Daham (born 1977), Algerian footballer
- Noureddine Kacemi (born 1977), Moroccan footballer
- Nordine Amrani (1978–2011), Belgian criminal and spree killer in the 2011 Liège attack.
- Nordine Ben Allal (born 1978/89), Moroccan-Belgian criminal
- Nourdin Boukhari (born 1980), Moroccan-Dutch footballer
- Nordine Sam (born 1982), Algerian-French footballer
- Nordin Gerzić (born 1983), Bosnian footballer
- Nordine Oubaali (born 1986), Moroccan-French boxer
- Nordin Amrabat (born 1987), Moroccan-Dutch footballer
- Nordine Assami (born 1987), Algerian-French footballer
- Noureddine Smaïl (born 1987), Algerian-French athlete
- Nurudeen Orelesi (born 1989), Nigerian footballer
- Nuruddin Khan (born 1940), chief of Bangladesh army
- Nourdine Midiladji, Comoros politician
- Nour Eddine (singer) (born 1964), Moroccan film director, musician, choreographer and singer, based in Italy
- Nordine Hachouf (born 1940), Algerian footballer
- Noor al-Deen (detainee), Syrian detained by the CIA

== Surname ==
- Mouna Noureddine (born 1937), Tunisian actress
- Jalal Mansur Nuriddin (1944–2018), American poet
- Mohamed Khaled Nordin (born 1958), Malaysian politician
- Juliette Noureddine (born 1962), French singer known as Juliette
- Zulkifli Noordin (born 1962), Malaysian politician
- Zainudin Nordin (born 1963), Singaporean politician
- Mohd Nasril Nourdin (born 1986), Malaysian footballer
- Herdi Noor Al-Deen (born 1992), Iraqi Kurdish footballer
- Muayyed Nureddin, Canadian Muslim detainee
- Dara Nur al-Din, Iraqi judge and politician

== Fictional characters ==
- Nour El Deen Mahmoud Nour El Deen

== See also ==
- Arabic name
- Nur al-Din Bimaristan, medieval hospital in Damascus
- Nur al-Din Madrasa, in Damascus
- Nur al-Din Mosque, in Hama
