= Al-Salam Mosque =

Al-Salam or As-Salam Mosque may refer to:

- Al-Salam Mosque, Syria
- Al-Salam Mosque, Odessa
- As-Salam Mosque, Santiago, Chile
- Salam Mosque, Riyadh, Saudi Arabia
- As-Salam Mosque, La Paz
