= Abu'l-Fida Mosque =

Mosque in Hama, Syria

- جَامِع أَبُو الْفِدَا
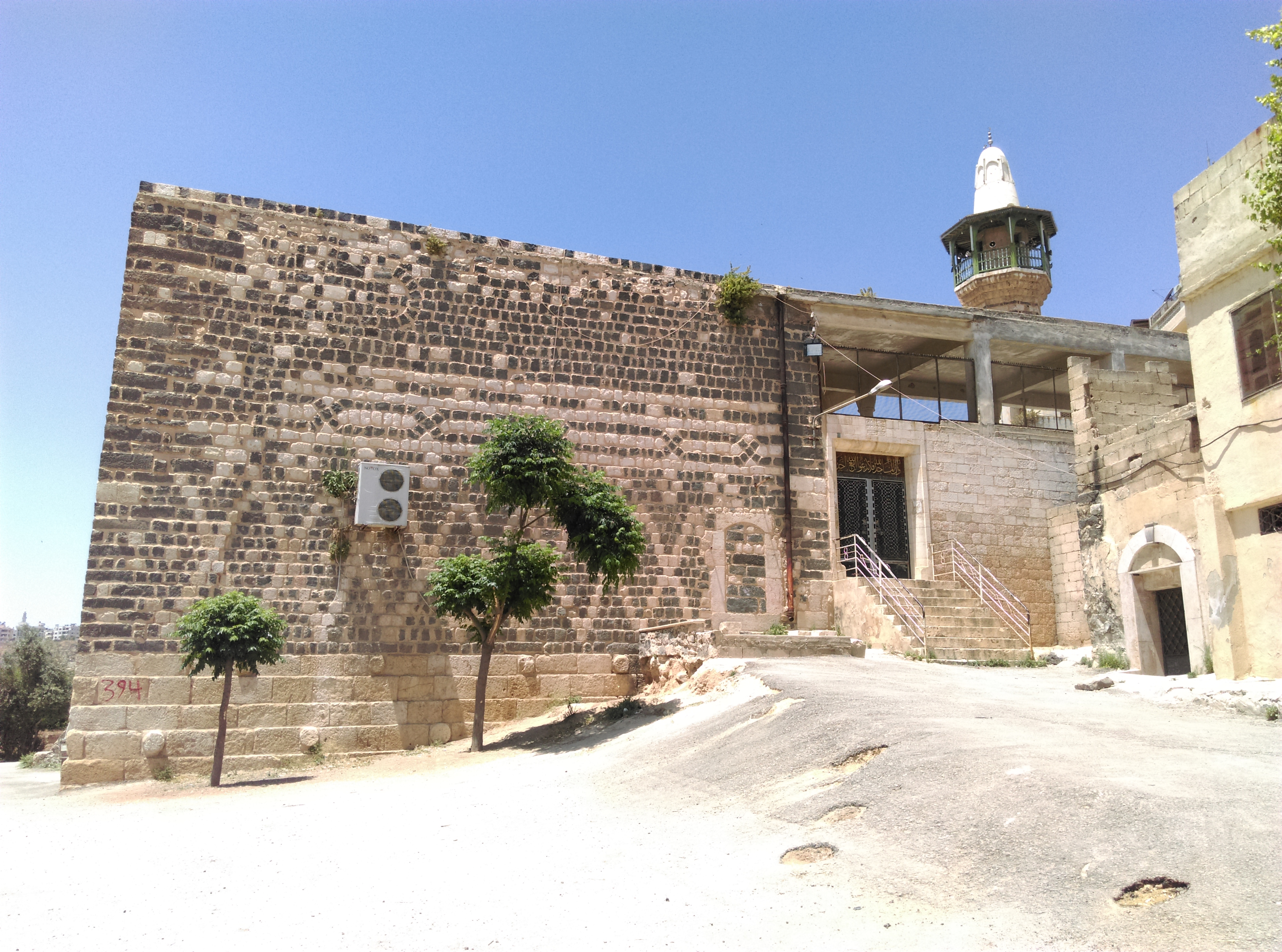
- The mosque in 2015

- Location of the mosque in Syria

Religion
- Affiliation: Islam
- Ecclesiastical or organisational status: Mosque; Mausoleum
- Status: Active

Location
- Location: Hama
- Country: Syria
- Interactive map of Abu'l-Fida Mosque
- Coordinates: 35°8′22″N 36°44′57″E

Architecture
- Type: Islamic architecture
- Style: Ayyubid; Mamluk
- Founder: al-Mu’ayyid Isma’il
- Completed: 1327 CE

Specifications
- Dome: 1
- Minaret: 1
- Materials: Basalt, limestone, tiles

The Abu'l-Fida Mosque (Arabic: جَامِع أَبُو الْفِدَا, romanized: Jāmiʿ Abū'l-Fidāʾ) is a mosque and mausoleum in Hama, Syria, located on the banks of the Orontes River. In 1327 CE, the mausoleum was erected by Abū al-Fidā during the Ayyubid-era; and the mosque dates from the Mamluk era. In 1331, Abū al-Fidā was engraved in the very mosque.

== Overview ==
The Mosque is in central Hama, on the bank of the Orontes, about 500 metres (0.31 mi) from the Nur al-Din Mosque and the norias. Adjacent to the mosque complex was a large walled garden. The complex comprises a small central sahn, the mosque has a small courtyard, and only two of its four original gates survive. The north gate dates from the Ayyubid period and leads into the courtyard and the Mausoleum of al-Mu’ayyid. Made of limestone with a domed brick roof, the mausoleum was completed in the Ayyubid style.

An attached limestone minaret was completed in contrasting black-basalt with limestone. Both the mausoleum and the minaret are in their original states. The haram, or sacred space, of the mosque is located to the south of the sahn. Most of what survives dates to the Mamluk period, with its south-facing façade overlooking the River Orontes. The mosque’s two windows are decorated with a central pillar carved in the shape of intertwined snakes; for this reason the mosque is known colloquially as Jami’ al-Hayyat, or the “Mosque of the Serpents”.

== See also ==
- Islam in Syria
- List of mosques in Syria
