= Yardımcı =

Yardımcı (Turkish: Helper) is a surname of Turkish origin. Notable people with the surname include:

- Barış Yardımcı (born 1992), Turkish football player
- Celal Yardımcı (1911–1986), Turkish politician
- Erencan Yardımcı (born 2002), Turkish football player
- Nurettin Yardımcı (born 1944), Turkish archaeologist
- Servet Yardımcı (born 1957), Turkish sports official
