= Al-Adiliyah Mosque =

Former mosque in Aleppo, Syria

al-Adiliyah Mosque
- جَامِع الْعَادِلِيَّة
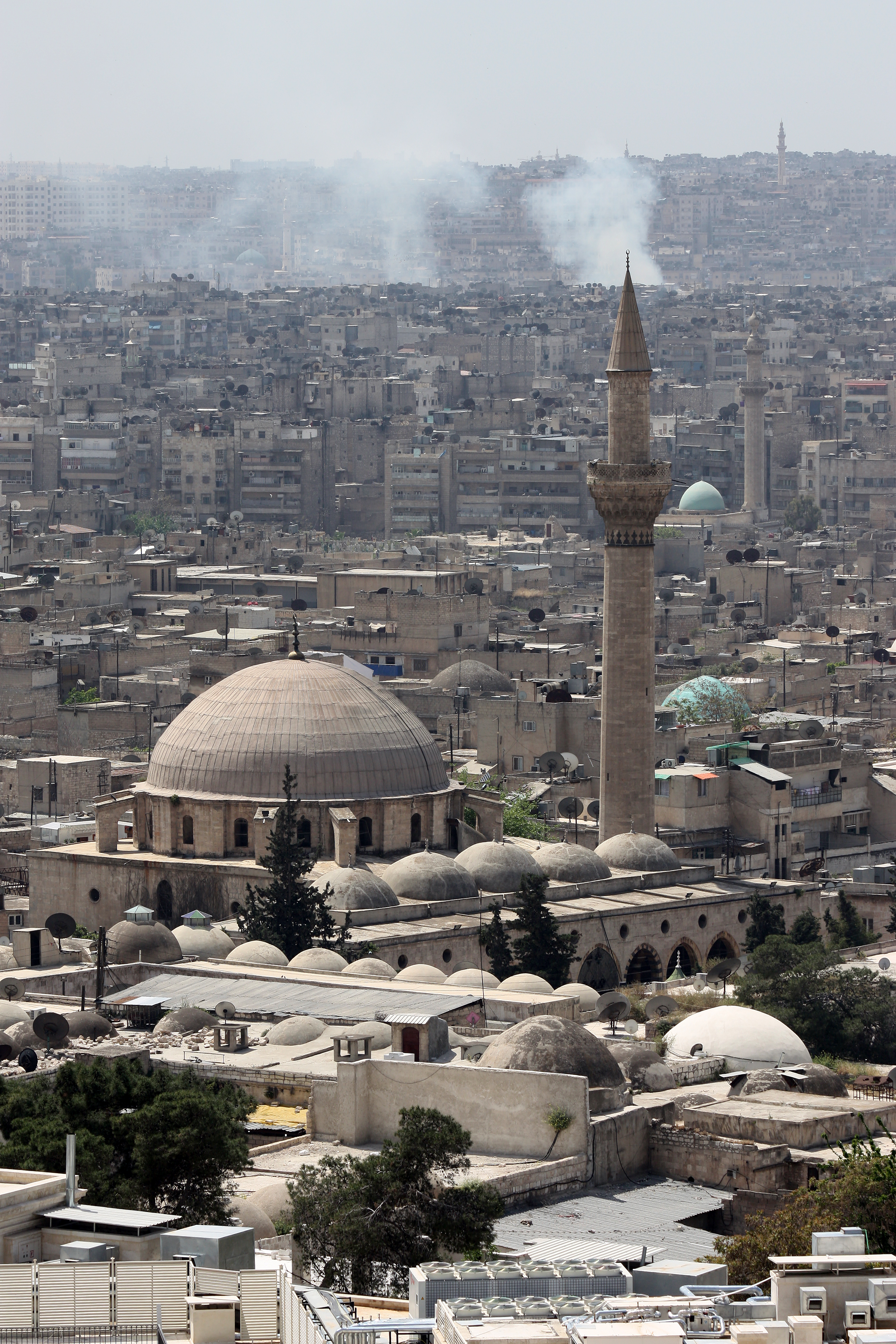
- The former mosque in 2010, prior to its c. 2015 partial destruction

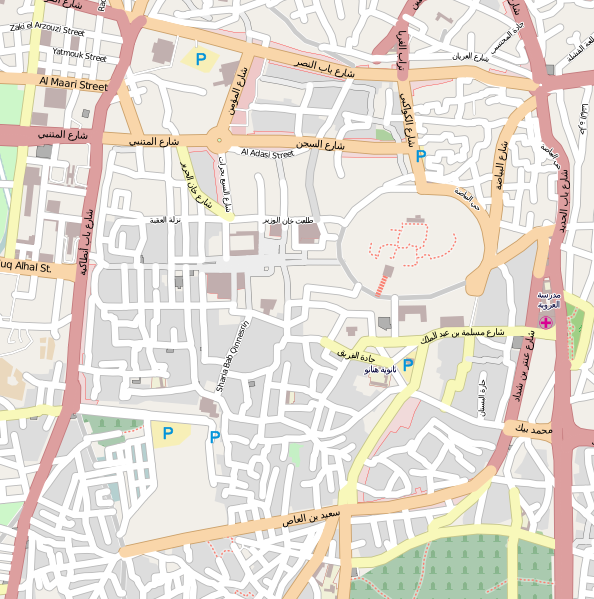
- Location of the former mosque in the Ancient City of Aleppo

Religion
- Affiliation: Islam (former)
- Ecclesiastical or organisational status: Mosque (1566–c. 2015)
- Status: Partially destroyed (in partial ruins)

Location
- Location: Aleppo
- Country: Syria
- Interactive map of al-Adiliyah Mosque
- Coordinates: 36°11′50.8″N 37°9′27.9″E

Architecture
- Architect: Mimar Sinan
- Type: Mosque
- Style: Ottoman architecture
- Completed: 1566 CE
- Destroyed: c. 2015 (in the Battle of Aleppo)

Specifications
- Dome: 1 (main)
- Minaret: 1
- Materials: Stone
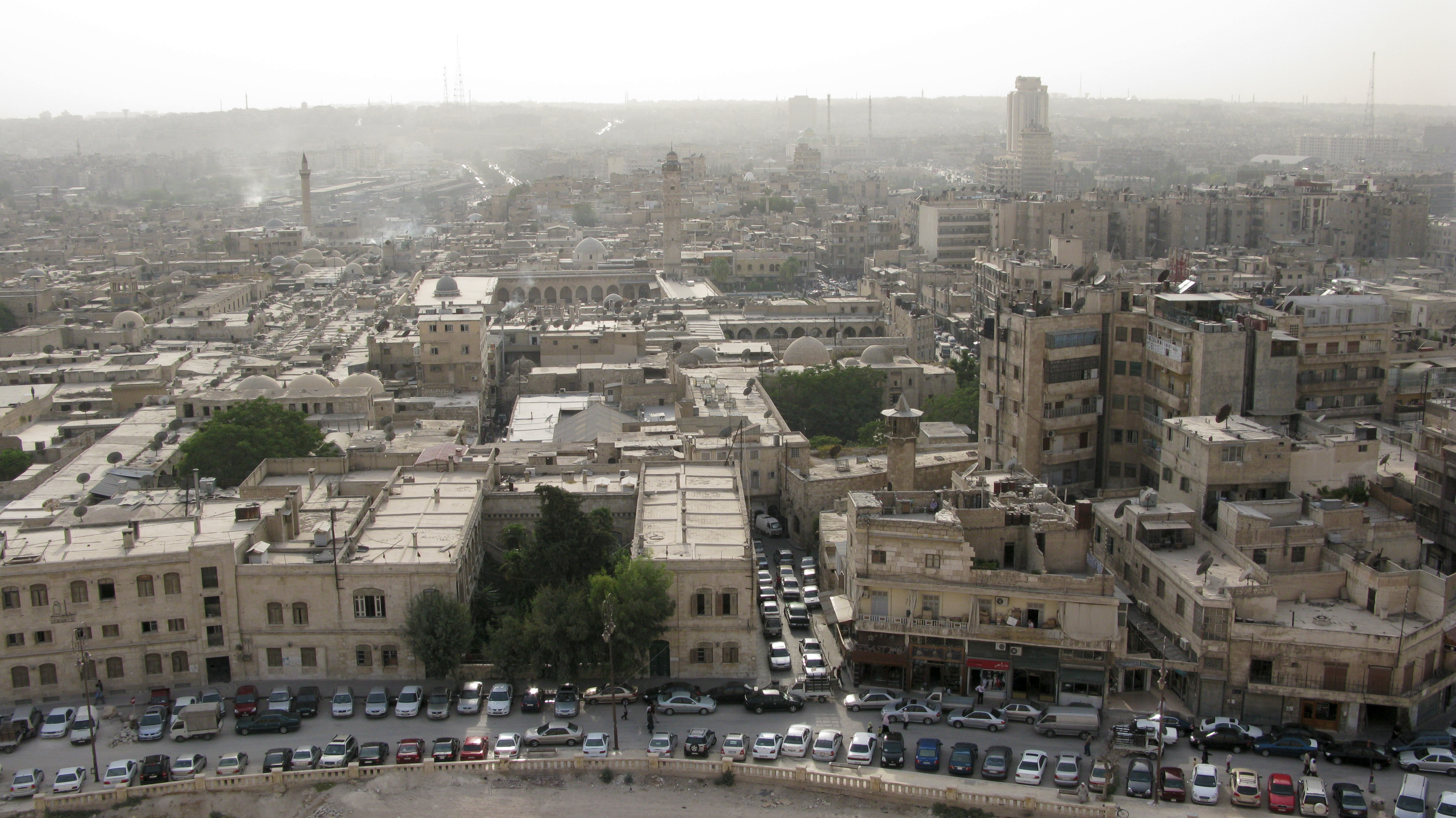
- Ancient Aleppo

UNESCO World Heritage Site
- Official name: Ancient City of Aleppo
- Location: Aleppo, Syria
- Includes: Citadel of Aleppo, Al-Madina Souq
- Criteria: Cultural: (iii), (iv)
- Reference: 21
- Inscription: 1986 (10th Session)
- Endangered: 2013–2020
- Area: 364 ha (1.41 sq mi)

The Al-Adiliyah Mosque (Arabic: جَامِع الْعَادِلِيَّة, romanized: Jāmiʿ al-ʿAdilīyah), or Dukaginzâde Mehmed Pasha Mosque, was a former külliye, now in partial ruins, in Aleppo, Syria.

Located to the southwest of the Citadel, in "Al-Jalloum" district of the Ancient City of Aleppo, a World Heritage Site, a few metres away from Al-Saffahiyah mosque, the former mosque was endowed by the Dukakinzade Mehmed Pasha in 1556. Dukakinzade Mehmed Pasha was the Albanian-Ottoman governor-general of Aleppo from 1551 until 1553 when he was appointed as governor-general of Egypt. He died in 1557 and the mosque was not completed until 973 AH (1565/1566 CE).

== Description ==
The complex was at the southern entrance of the covered suq of ancient Aleppo. The mosque became known as the Adiliyya because of its position near the governor's palace, the Dar al-Adl, also known as the Dar al-Saada. The former mosque had a large domed prayer hall preceded by a double portico. Above the windows on the north side and in the prayer hall are brightly coloured tiled lunette panels; probably imported from Iznik in Turkey.

The mosque was partially destroyed during the Battle of Aleppo in the summer of 2014 or 2015.

== Gallery ==
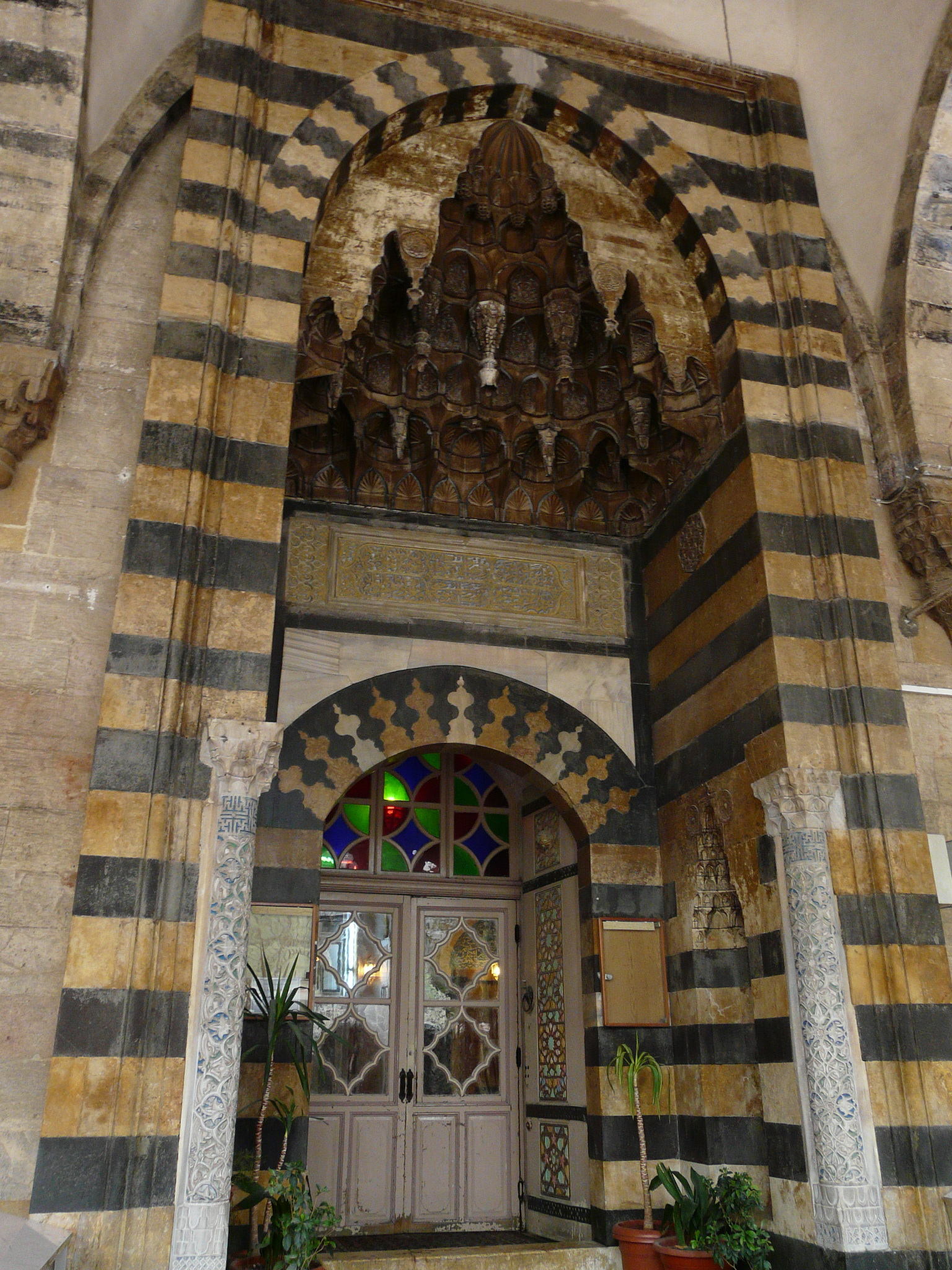
The main entrance

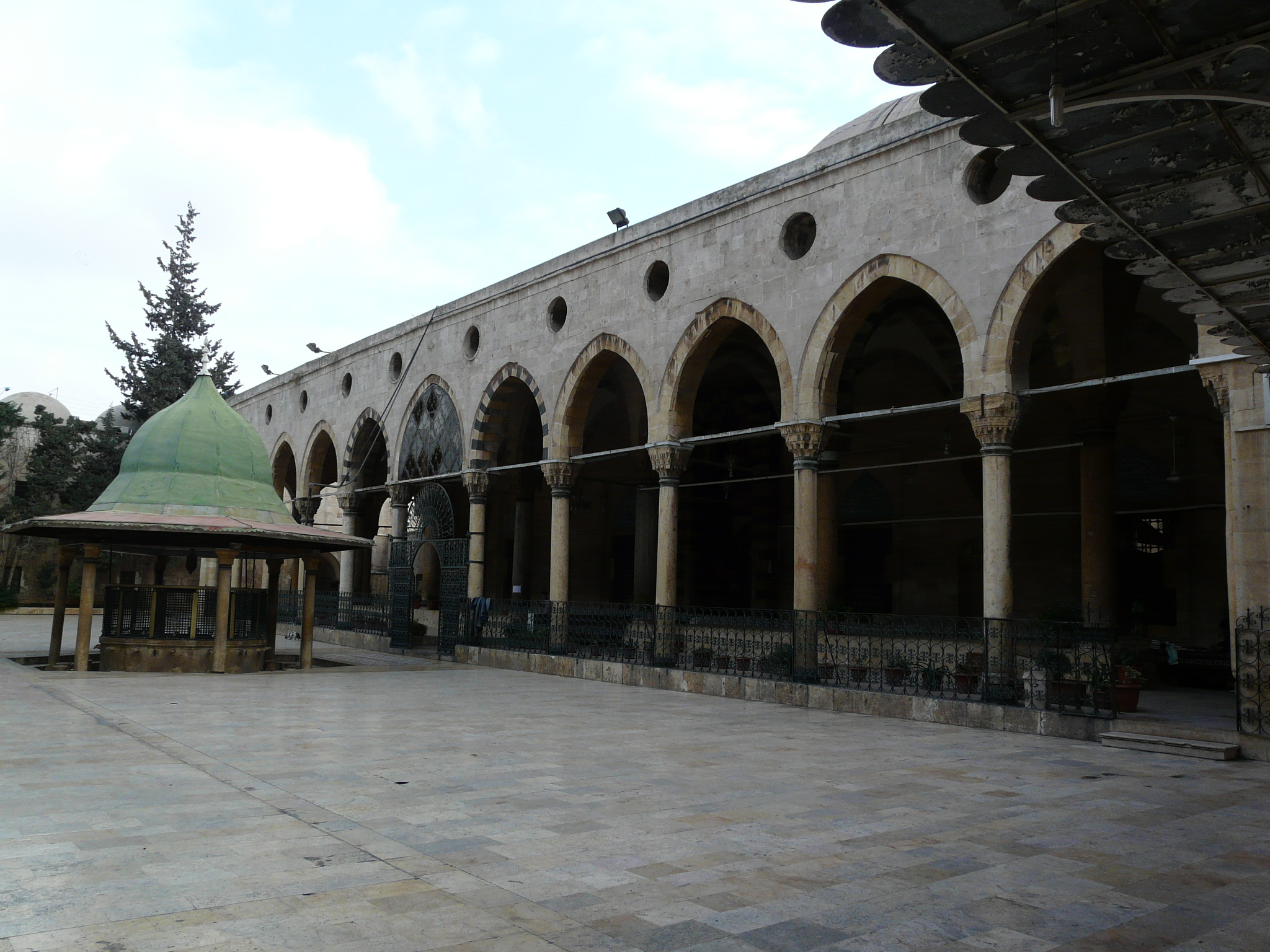
The courtyard

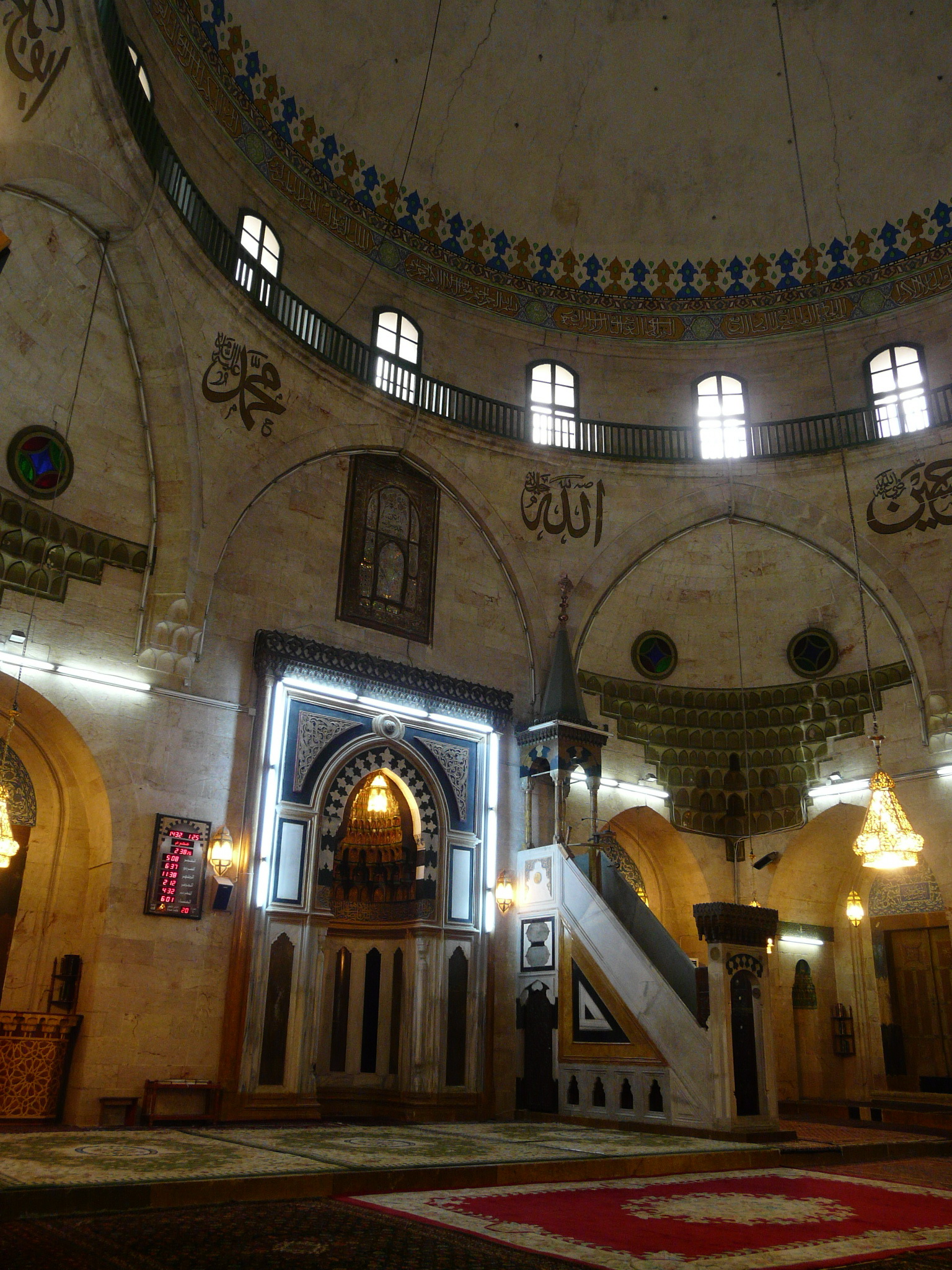
Inside the mosque

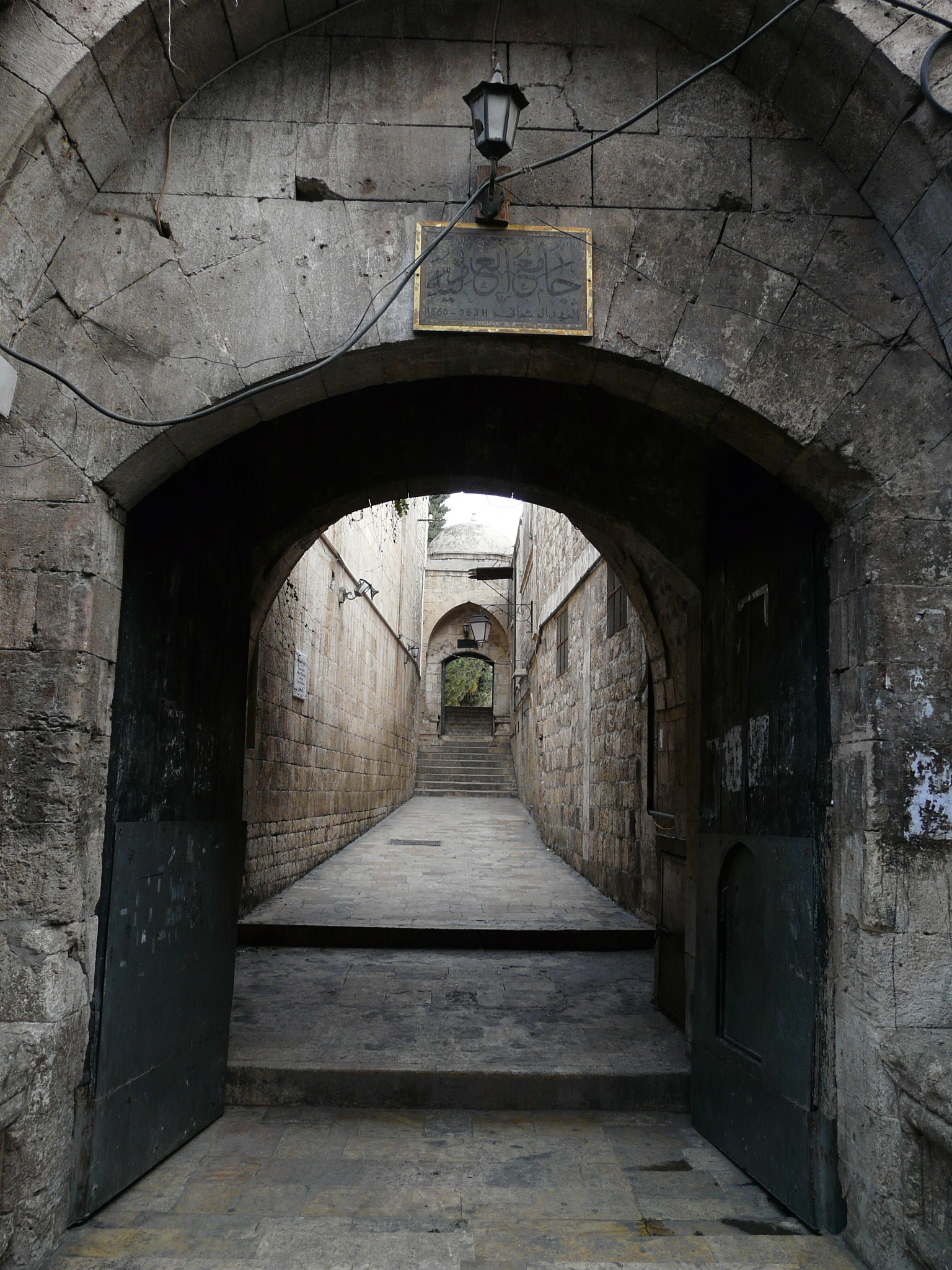
The alley leading to the entrance

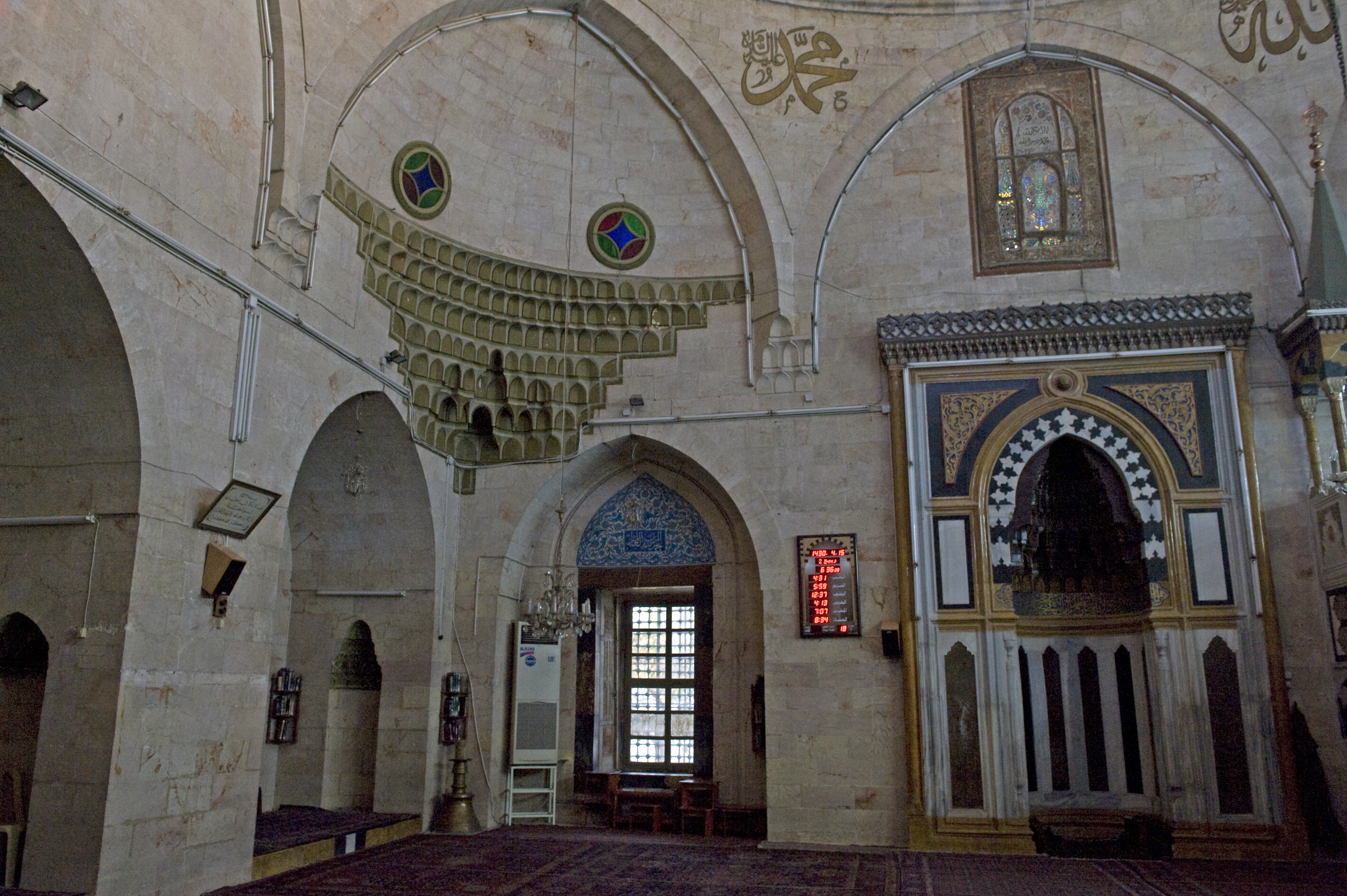
Interior with mihrab

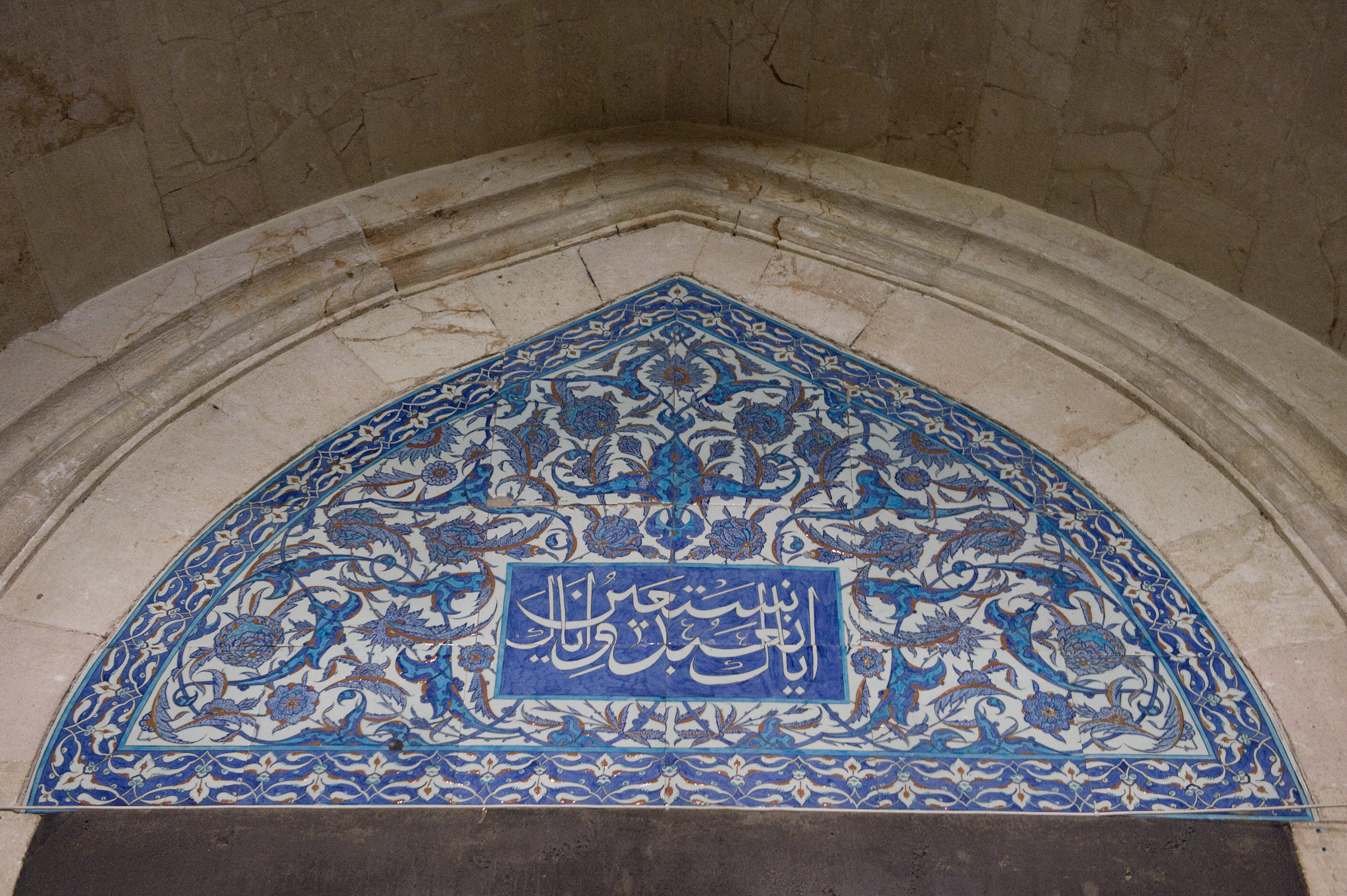
Tiles above window

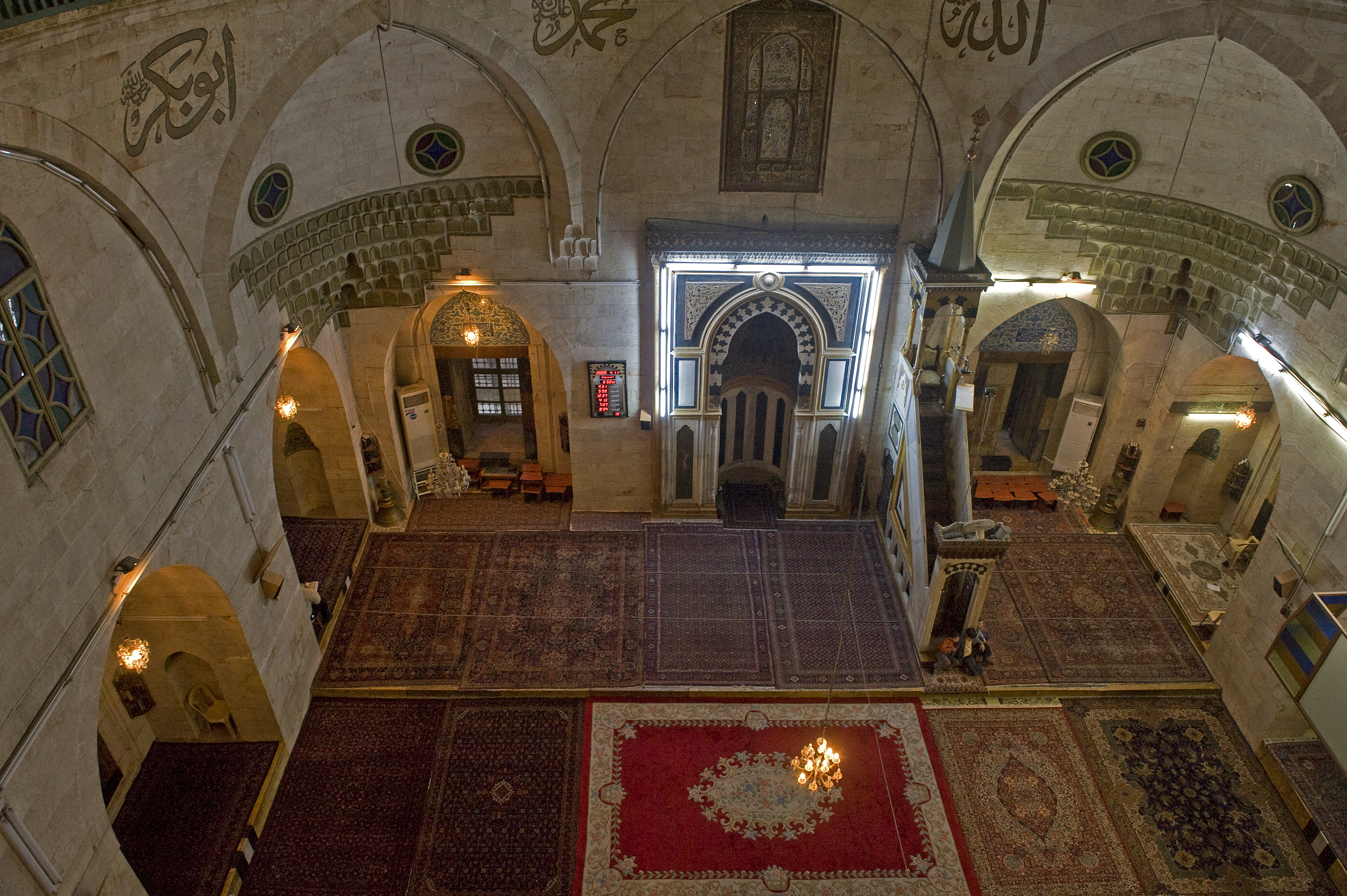
View from "whispering gallery"

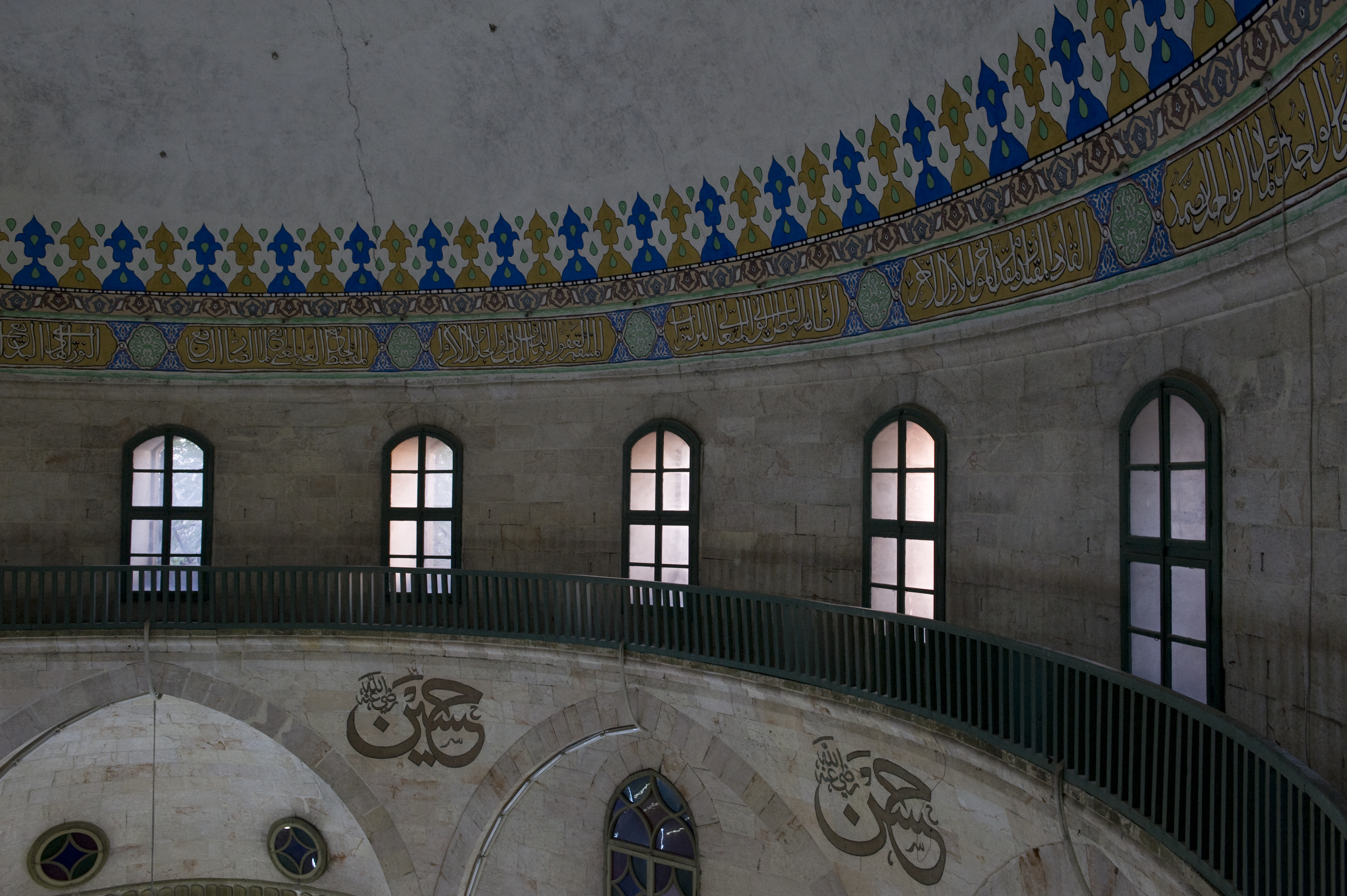
The "whispering gallery"

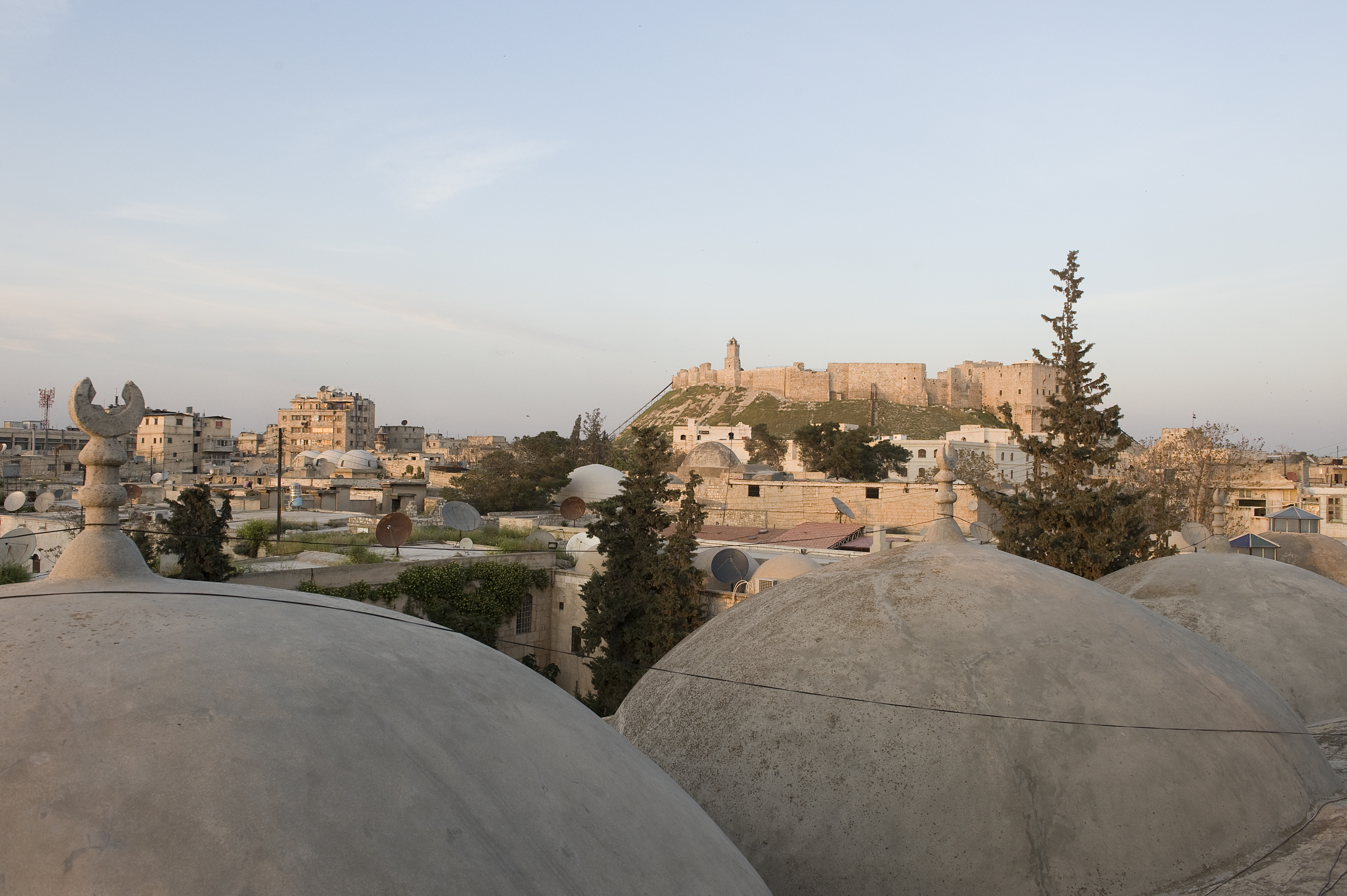
View from below dome with citadel

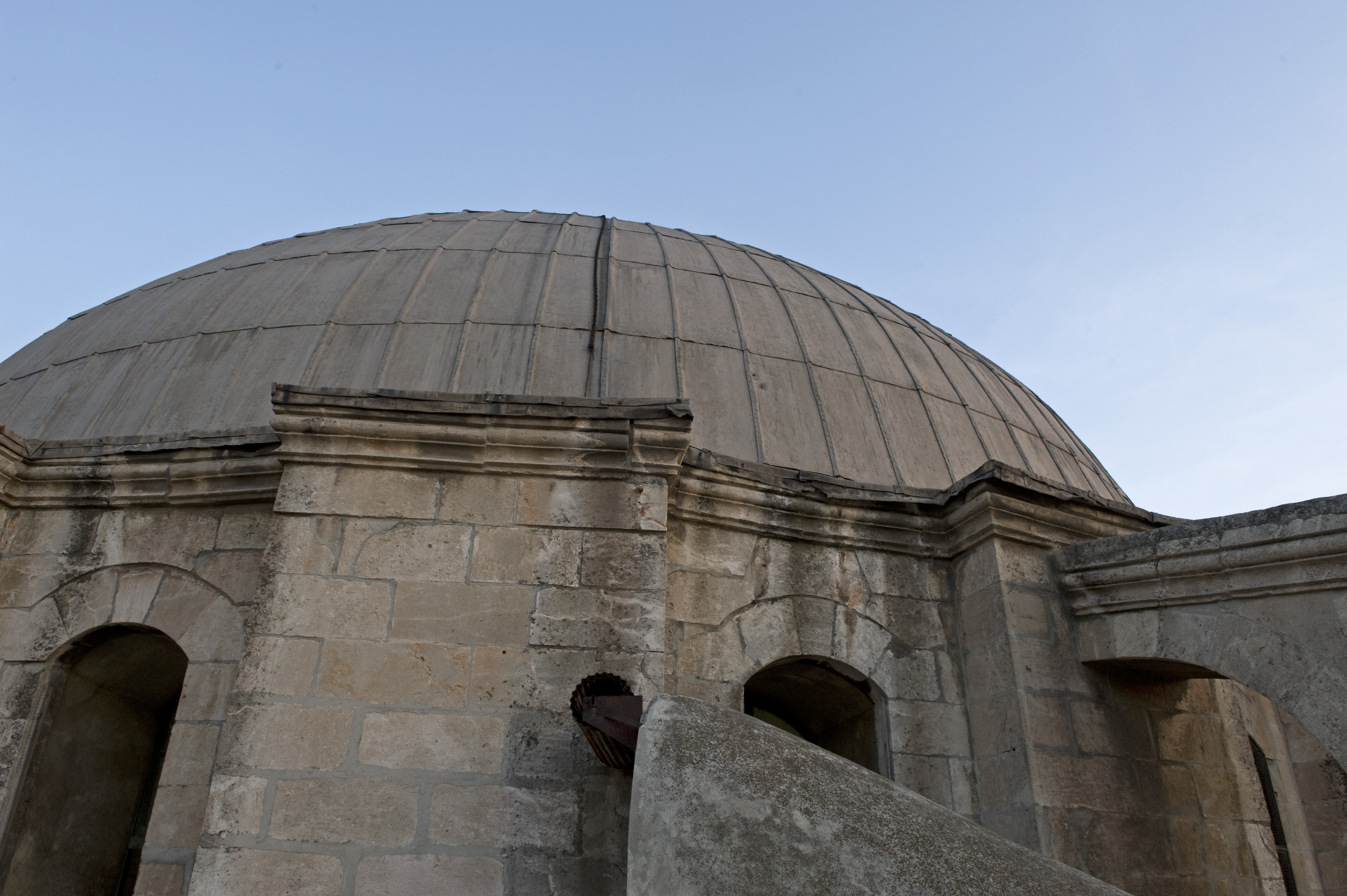
View of dome from a little below

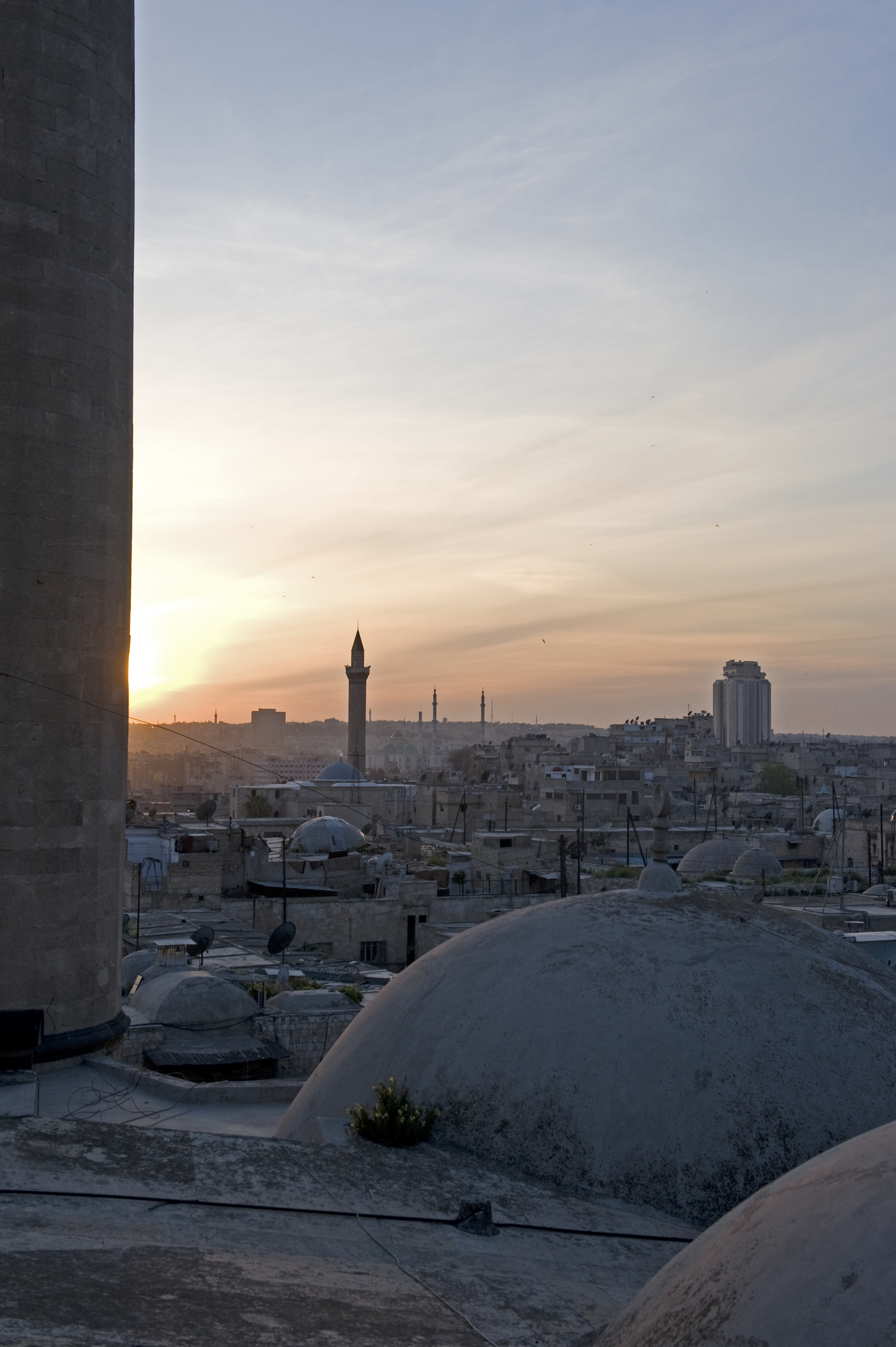
View from below dome in setting sun

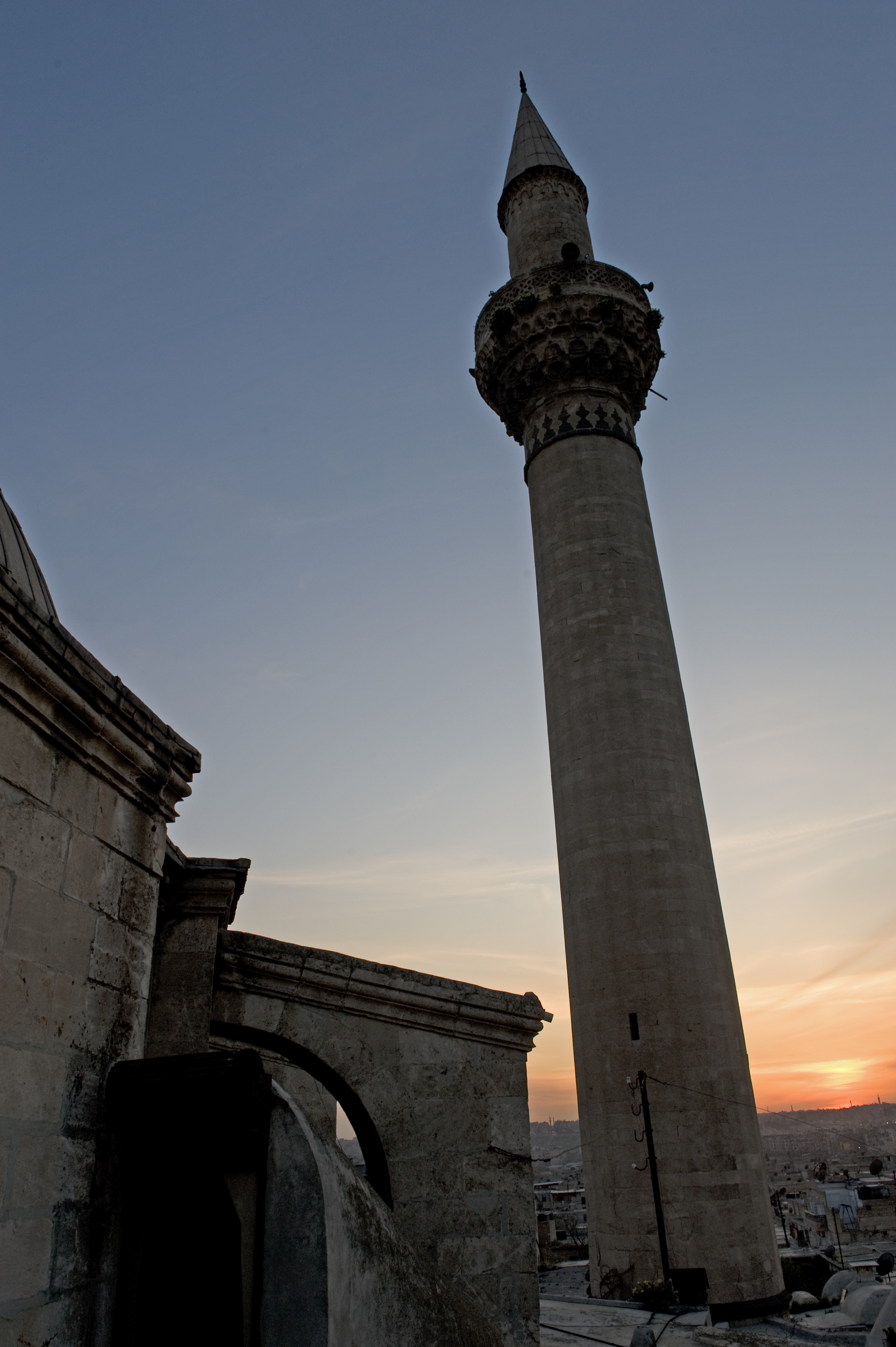
View from below minaret in setting sun

== See also ==
- Islam in Syria
- List of mosques in Aleppo
- List of mosques in Syria
