= Sharjah Award for Arabic Poetry =

Poetry award

Sharjah Award for Arabic Poetry Criticism
- Awarded for: Excellence in Arabic poetry criticism
- Country: United Arab Emirates
- Presented by: Sharjah Department of Culture
- Rewards: 1st prize: 100,000 AED; 2nd prize: 75,000 AED; 3rd prize: 50,000 AED
- First award: 2020
- Website: Official website

The Sharjah Award for Arabic Poetry is a literary prize launched in the Emirate of Sharjah, United Arab Emirates, in 2011 under the patronage of Sheikh Sultan bin Muhammad Al Qasimi. The award aims to honor one Emirati and one Arab figure in the field of Arabic poetry in each edition.

== Honored Poets ==
Edition	Year	Emirati Poet	Arab Poet	Country
First	2011	Not awarded	Mohamed Al-Tuhami	Egypt
Second	2012	Mohammed bin Hadir	Mohammad Najib Al-Murad	Syria
Third	2013	Abdulaziz Ismail	Khalifa Al-Wuqayan	Kuwait
Fourth	2014	Salem Al-Zamr	Haroun Hashim Rashid	Palestine
Fifth	2015	Abdullah Al-Hadiya	Mohammed Ali Shamsuddin	Lebanon
Sixth	2016	Ahmed Mohammed Obeid	Rashid Issa	Jordan
Seventh	2017	Ibrahim Mohammed Ibrahim	Muhyiddin Al-Fateh	Sudan
Eighth	2018	Abdulkarim Maatouq	Noureddine Sammoud	Tunisia
Ninth	2019	Saif Al-Mari	Mohammed Al-Shahawi	Egypt
Tenth	2020	Talal Salem	Ismail Zweiriq	Morocco
Eleventh	2023	Shaikha Al-Mutairi	Hassan bin Mohammed Al-Zahrani	Saudi Arabia
Twelfth	2024	Ali Al-Shaali	Aref Al-Saadi	Iraq

== See also ==
- Sharjah Award for Arab Creativity
- Department of Culture and Information – Sharjah
