= Great Mosque of Raqqa =

Former mosque in Raqqa, Syria

- الْجَامِعُ الْكَبِيرُ فِي الرَّقَّةِ
- Location of the mosque in Syria

Religion
- Affiliation: Islam (former)
- Ecclesiastical or organizational status: Mosque (772)
- Status: Inactive (ruinous state)

Location
- Location: Raqqa
- Country: Syria
- Interactive map of Great Mosque of Raqqa
- Coordinates: 35°57′7″N 39°1′15″E

Architecture
- Type: Islamic architecture
- Style: Abbasid
- Completed: 772 CE

Specifications
- Minaret: 1
- Shrine: 1
- Materials: Mud brick; stucco

The Great Mosque of Raqqa (Arabic: ٱلْجَامِع ٱلْكَبِير فِي ٱلرَّقَّة, romanized: al-Jāmiʿ al-Kabīr fi ar-Raqqah) or Al-Qadim Mosque (Arabic: مَسْجِد ٱلْقَدِيم, romanized: Masjid al-Qadīm) is the oldest mosque, currently in a ruinous state, in Raqqa, Syria, located at the northern section of the city's heart.

The mosque was built by the Abbasids in 772 CE, under the reign of caliph al-Mansur. All that remains of the mosque today are the baked brick minaret (25 meters (82 ft)) and the prayer hall (haram) façade with eleven arches that were added by Nur ad-Din Zangi during the 1165 CE renovation of the mosque. There used to be a small shrine in the center attributed to Wabisa ibn Ma'bad al-Asadi.

== Architecture ==
The mosque has a rectangular plan, measuring 108 by 92 metres (354 by 302 ft), with 1.7-metre (5.6 ft) thick mud brick walls fortified with semi-circular towers at the corners. The outer walls of the mosque are constructed of mud bricks supported by solid semi-circular buttress towers. The prayer hall consisted of three arcades supported on cylindrical piers, whilst the other three sides were lined with double arcades. The building is decorated with stucco, traces of which survive.

=== Damage ===
The first damage to the al-Qadim Mosque occurred under ISIS-control of the city. DigitalGlobe satellite imagery illustrated that between October 2013 and February 2014, the small Ottoman-period shrine built in 1836 CE, around the purported grave of Wabisa ibn Ma'bad al-Asadi, a companion of Muhammad, was bulldozed. Images were later released of the shrine's destruction.

In June 2017, at the start of operations by the US-backed Syrian Democratic Forces and the Raqqa Media Office reported that shelling had struck the mosque and the surrounding areas, resulting in casualties.

== Cemetery ==
The courtyard of the mosque was a graveyard for residents who could not make safe to cemeteries.

== See also ==
- Islam in Syria
- List of mosques in Syria
