= Yalbugha Mosque =

Mosque in Damascus, Syria

- جَامِع يَلْبُغَا
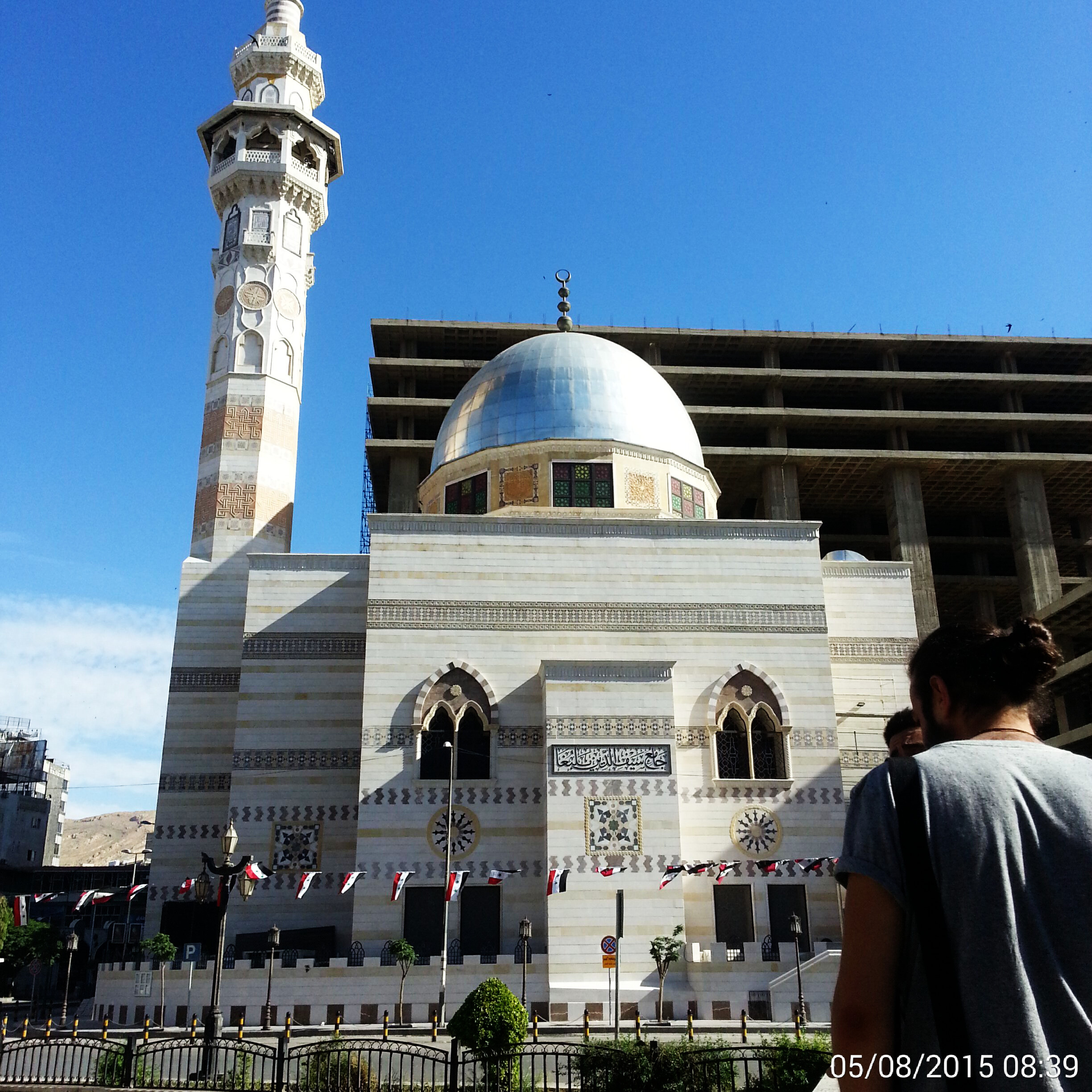
- The modern mosque in 2015

- Location of the modern mosque in Damascus

Religion
- Affiliation: Islam
- Ecclesiastical or organisational status: Mosque: (1264–19th century); (since 2014–)
- Status: Active

Location
- Location: Damascus
- Country: Syria
- Interactive map of Yalbugha Mosque
- Coordinates: 33°30′48″N 36°17′54″E

Architecture
- Type: Islamic architecture
- Completed: 1264 CE (first); 2014 (current)
- Demolished: 1974 (first)

Specifications
- Dome: 1
- Minaret: 1
- Materials: Limestone, basalt

The Yalbugha Mosque (Arabic: جَامِع يَلْبُغَا, romanized: Jāmi‘ Yalbuḡā) was a 13th-century mosque on the Barada river in Damascus, Syria. It was built by the Mamluks in 1264 CE or by Yalbughā al-Yahyāwī in 1346–47 CE. During the reign of Ibrahim Pasha (1832–1840) it was converted to use as a biscuit factory.

The former mosque was demolished in 1974 to make way for a redevelopment and a modern mosque completed on the site, that was opened on 27 October 2014.

The original mosque followed a hypostyle plan organized around a central courtyard, representing a markedly different architectural configuration from that of the present mosque. The courtyard was accessed through three muqarnas portals located on the eastern, northern, and western sides,andwas flanked by madrasa rooms along all three sides. The eastern portal of the courtyard is the sole surviving architectural element of the Mamluk-era mosque and is currently displayed in the garden of the National Museum of Damascus.

== Gallery ==
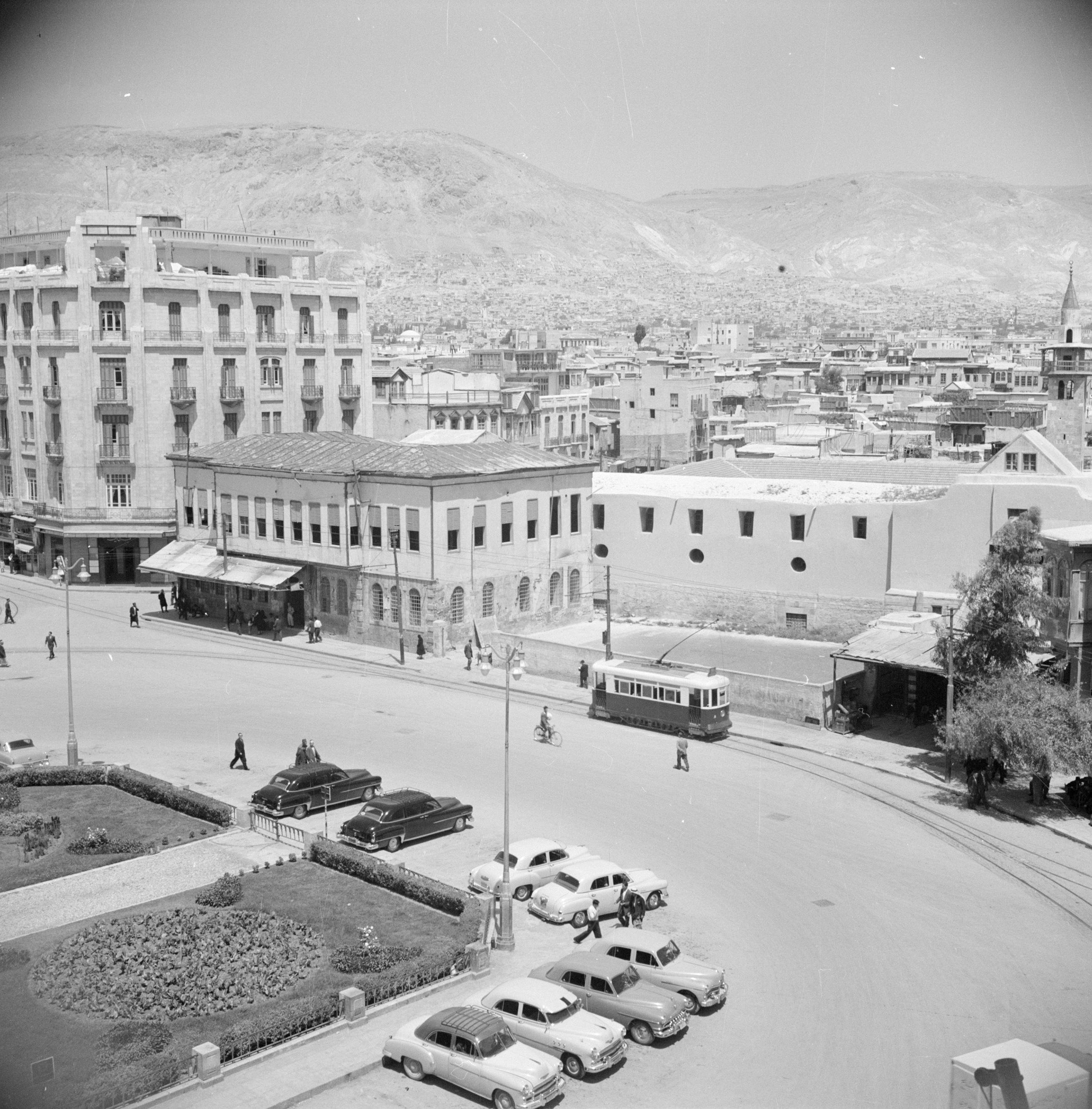
The original mosque’s former southern wall and minaret, as seen in 1950 (right)

== See also ==
- Islam in Syria
- List of mosques in Syria
