= Al-Omari Mosque (Daraa) =

Mosque in Daraa, Syria

- الْمَسْجِد الْعُمَرِي
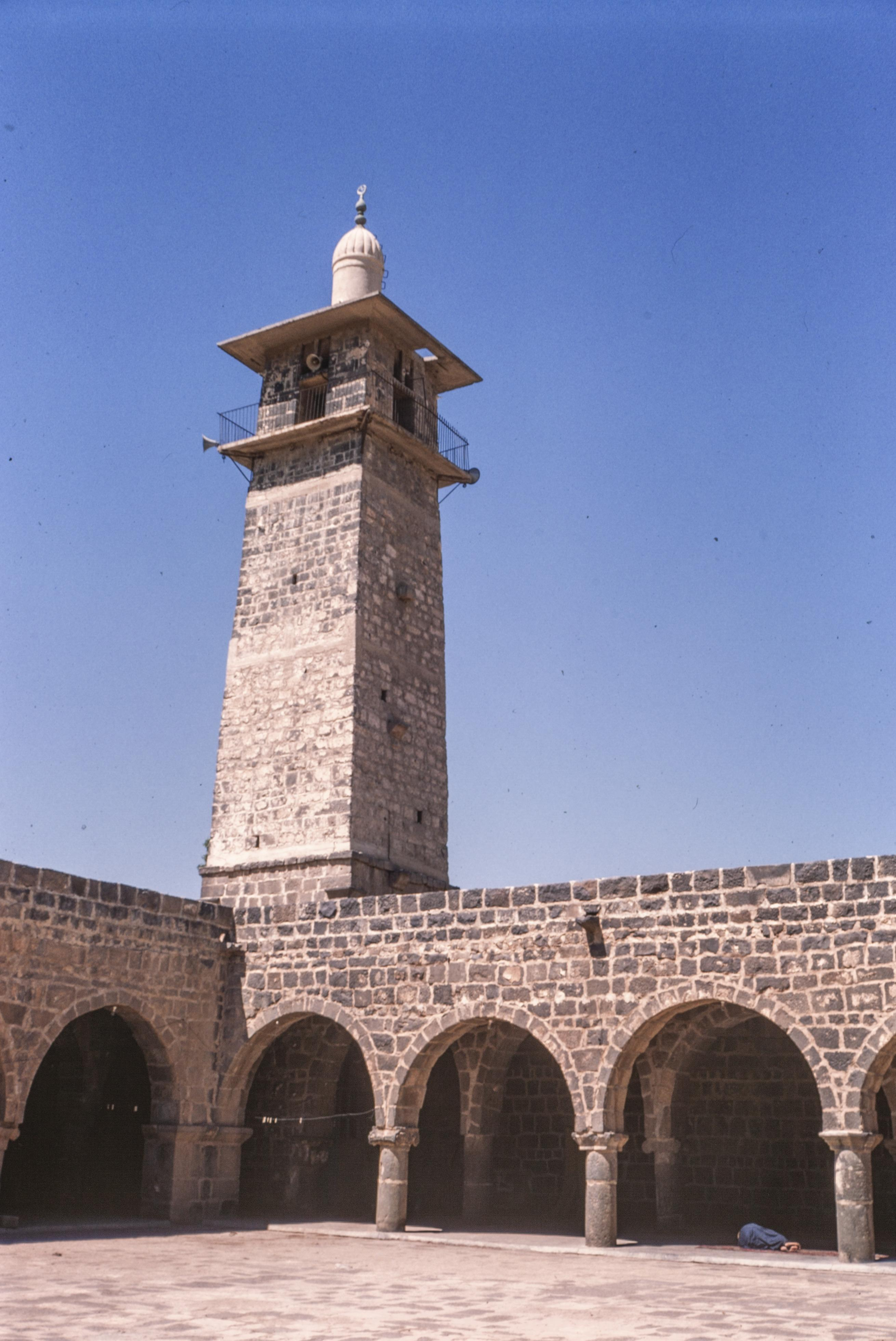
- courtyard and minaret of the mosque (1978)

Religion
- Affiliation: Islam
- Ecclesiastical or organisational status: Mosque
- Status: Active (renovated)

Location
- Location: Daraa, Daraa Governorate
- Country: Syria
- Interactive map of Al-Omari Mosque
- Coordinates: 32°36′44.28″N 36°6′3.6″E

Architecture
- Style: Islamic architecture
- Founder: Caliph Umar
- Completed: 636 CE
- Minaret: 1

The Al-Omari Mosque of Daraa (Arabic: الْمَسْجِد الْعُمَرِي, romanized: al-Masjid al-ʿUmarīy) is a mosque in city of Daraa, Syria. The mosque was founded by Caliph Umar, who led the Muslim conquest of Syria in 636 CE. The mosque was bombarded during the Syrian civil war. The mosque has been renovated, and is active.

== Gallery ==
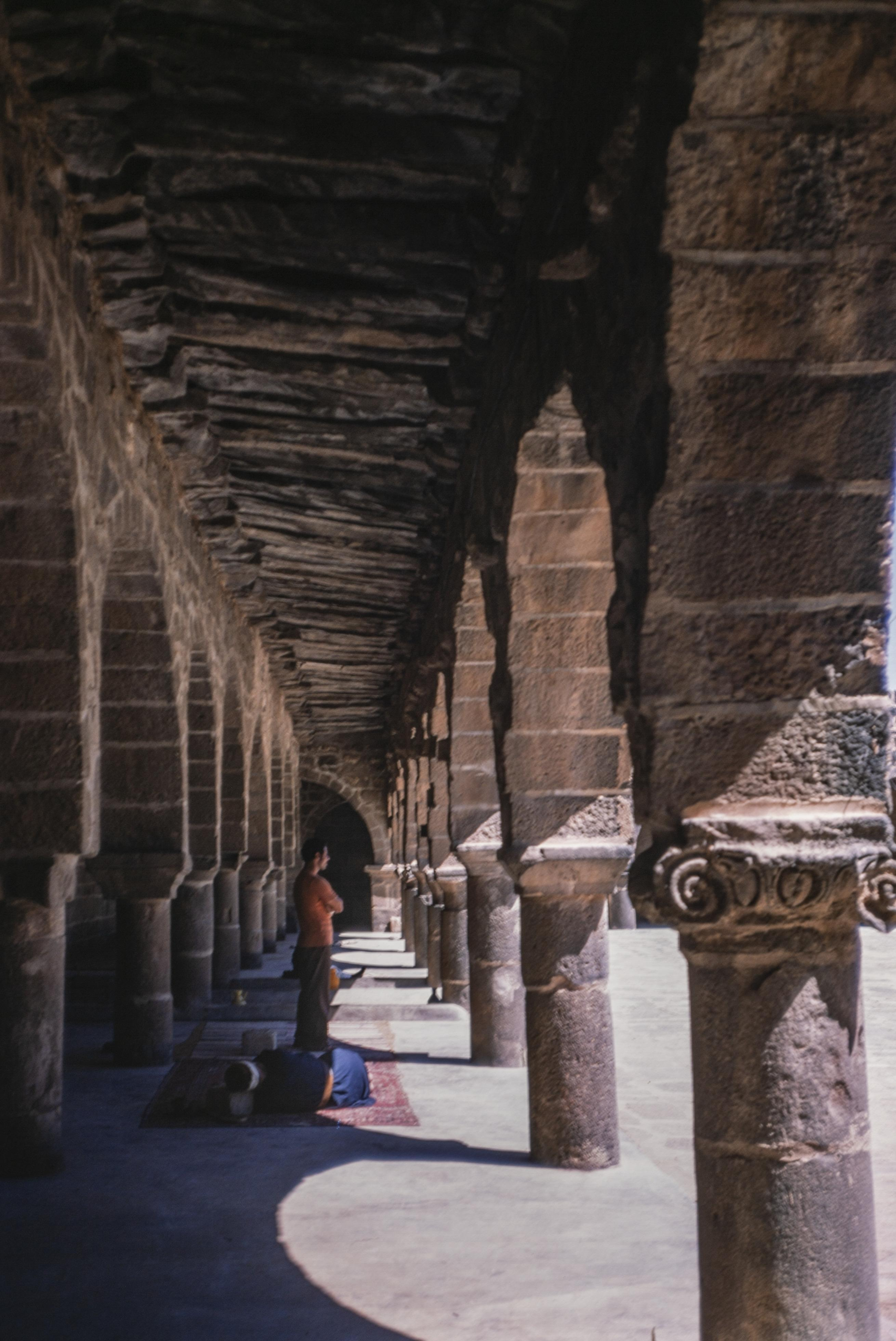
The arcades in the courtyard

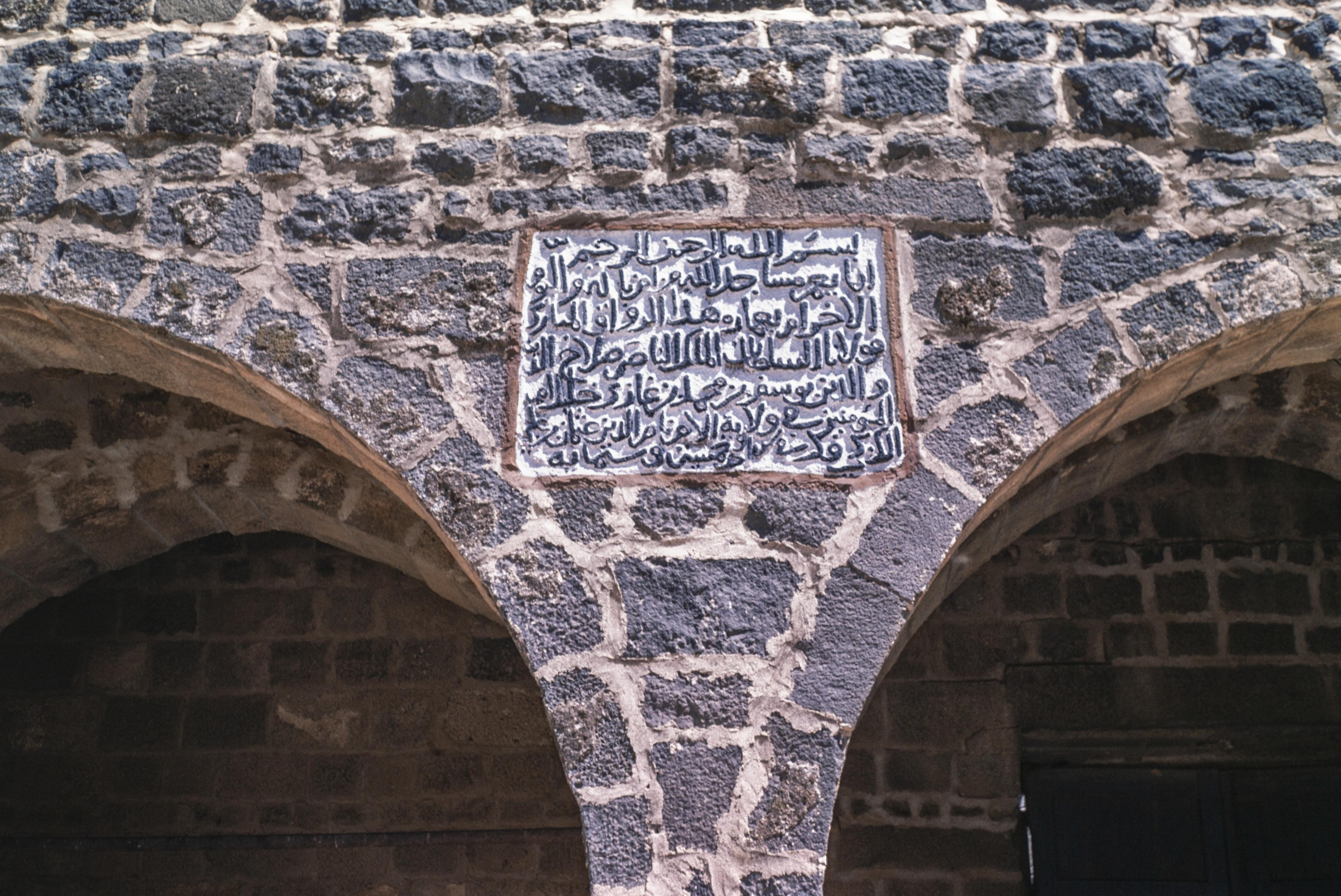
an inscription indicating the construction of the arcade by the Ayyubid emir of Syria Al-Nasir Yusuf in 1253–1254 CE (651 AH)

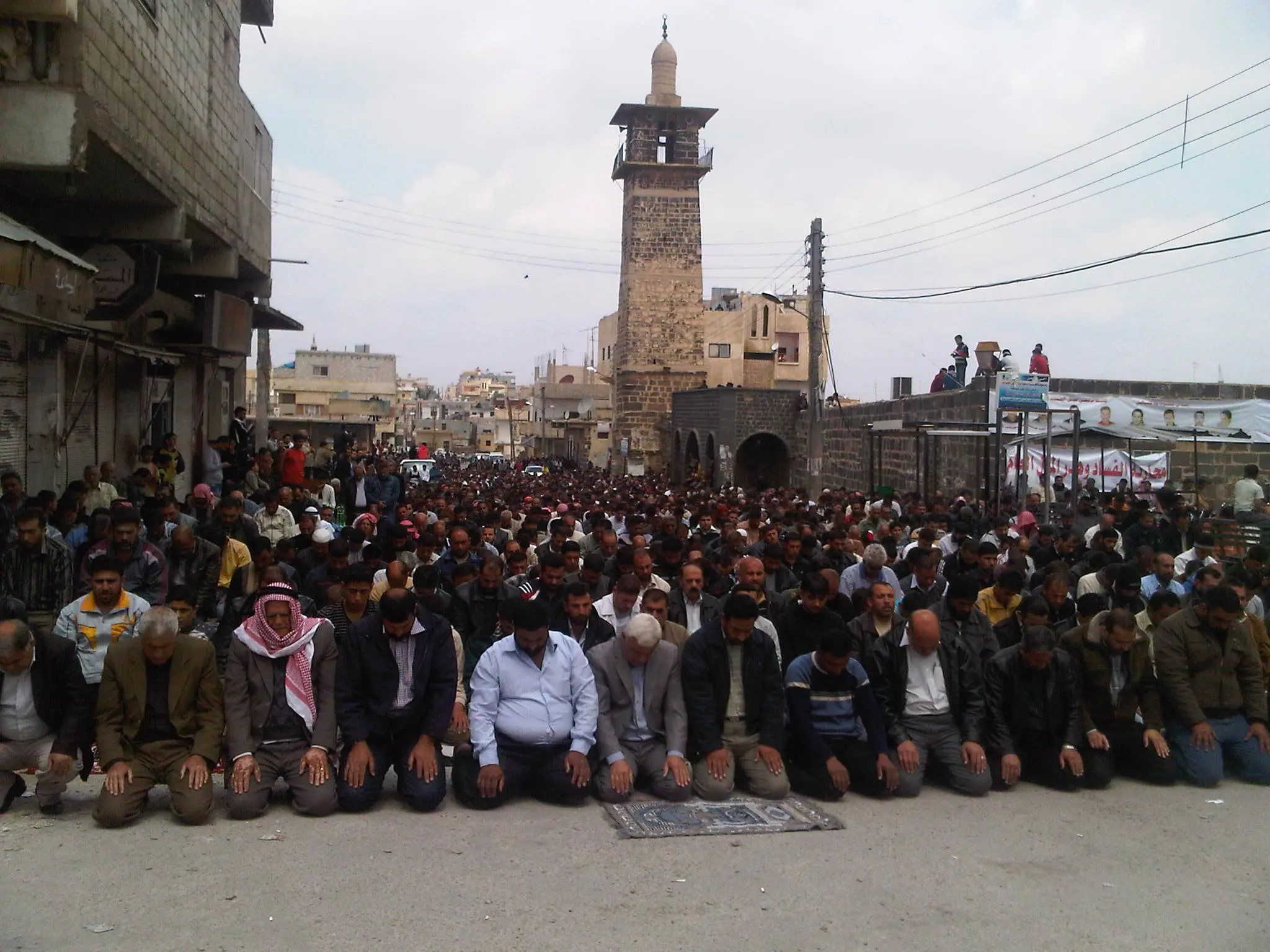
Prayers outside of the mosque after the first protests in 2011

== See also ==
- List of mosques in Syira
- Islam in Syria
