= Al-Atassi Mosque =

Mosque in Homs, Syria

- مَسْجِد ٱلْأَتَاسِيّ
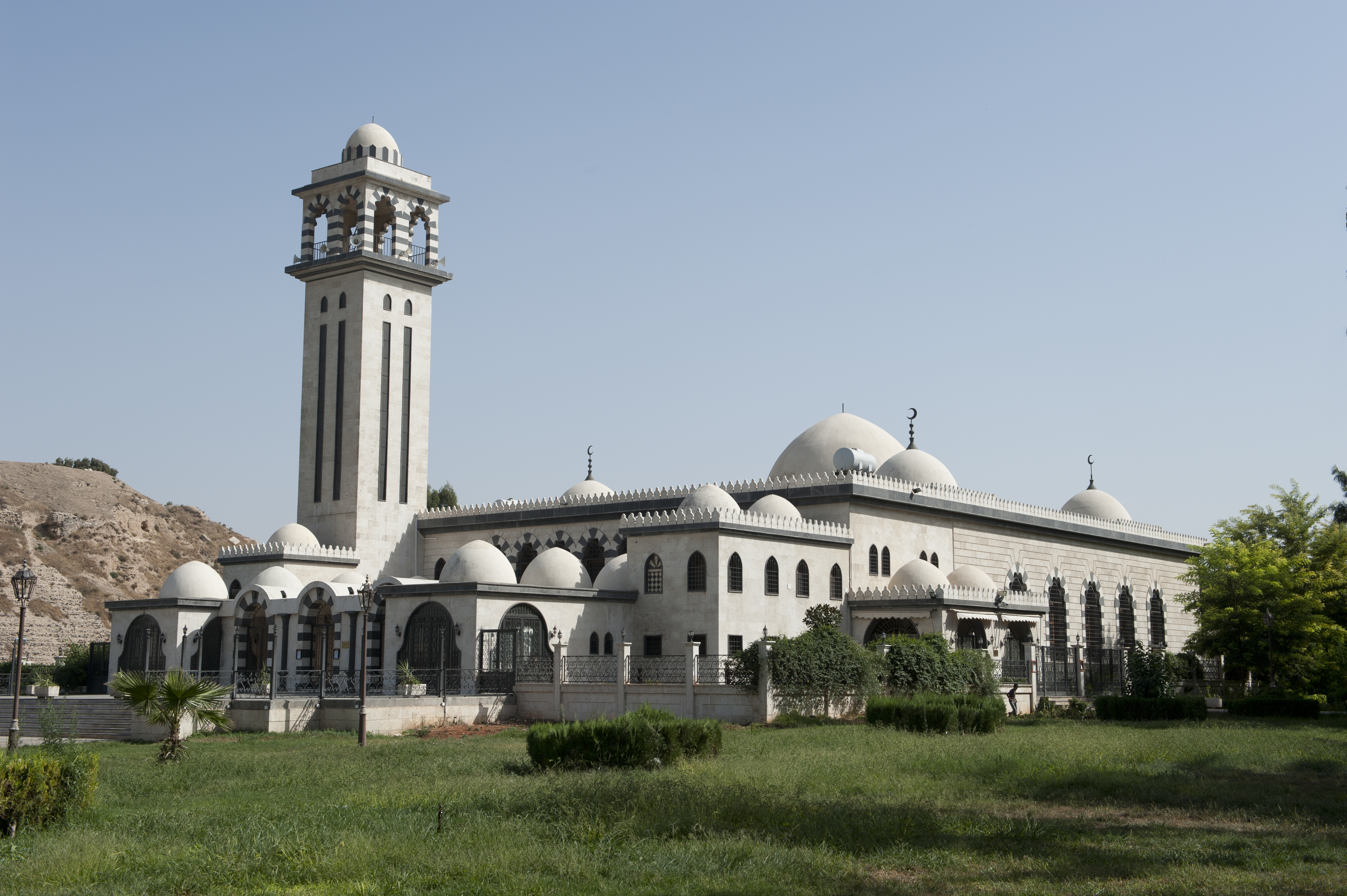
- The mosque in 2010

- Location of the mosque in Syria

Religion
- Affiliation: Islam
- Ecclesiastical or organizational status: Mosque
- Status: Active

Location
- Location: Homs
- Country: Syria
- Interactive map of Al-Atassi Mosque
- Coordinates: 34°43′24″N 36°42′43″E

Architecture
- Type: Islamic architecture
- Style: Ottoman
- Founder: Abdul Latif Pasha al-Atassi
- Funded by: Al-Atassi family
- Completed: 1913 CE
- Construction cost: LS 50,000,000; (US$1,000,000)

Specifications
- Capacity: 3,000 worshippers
- Interior area: 3,000 m^{2} (32,000 sq ft)
- Domes: 18 total; 1 large; 4 medium; 13 small
- Minaret: 1
- Materials: Aleppo marble; ivory

The Al-Atassi Mosque (Arabic: مَسْجِد ٱلْأَتَاسِيّ, romanized: Masjid al-ʾAtāsīy), also known as the Great Al-Atassi Mosque, is a mosque in Homs, Syria. It is situated in a public park on the site of a former graveyard at the foot of the mound on which the remains of the citadel stand.

Completed in 1913 CE, the mosque is named after Hashim al-Atassi, three-time Syrian President from the Al-Atassi family, a prominent landowning and politically active family from Homs. The mosque features a late Ottoman style that combines lead domes and slender hexagonal minarets. It is notable for the colors of the Aleppo marble in the mihrab and the ivory pulpit.

== Gallery ==
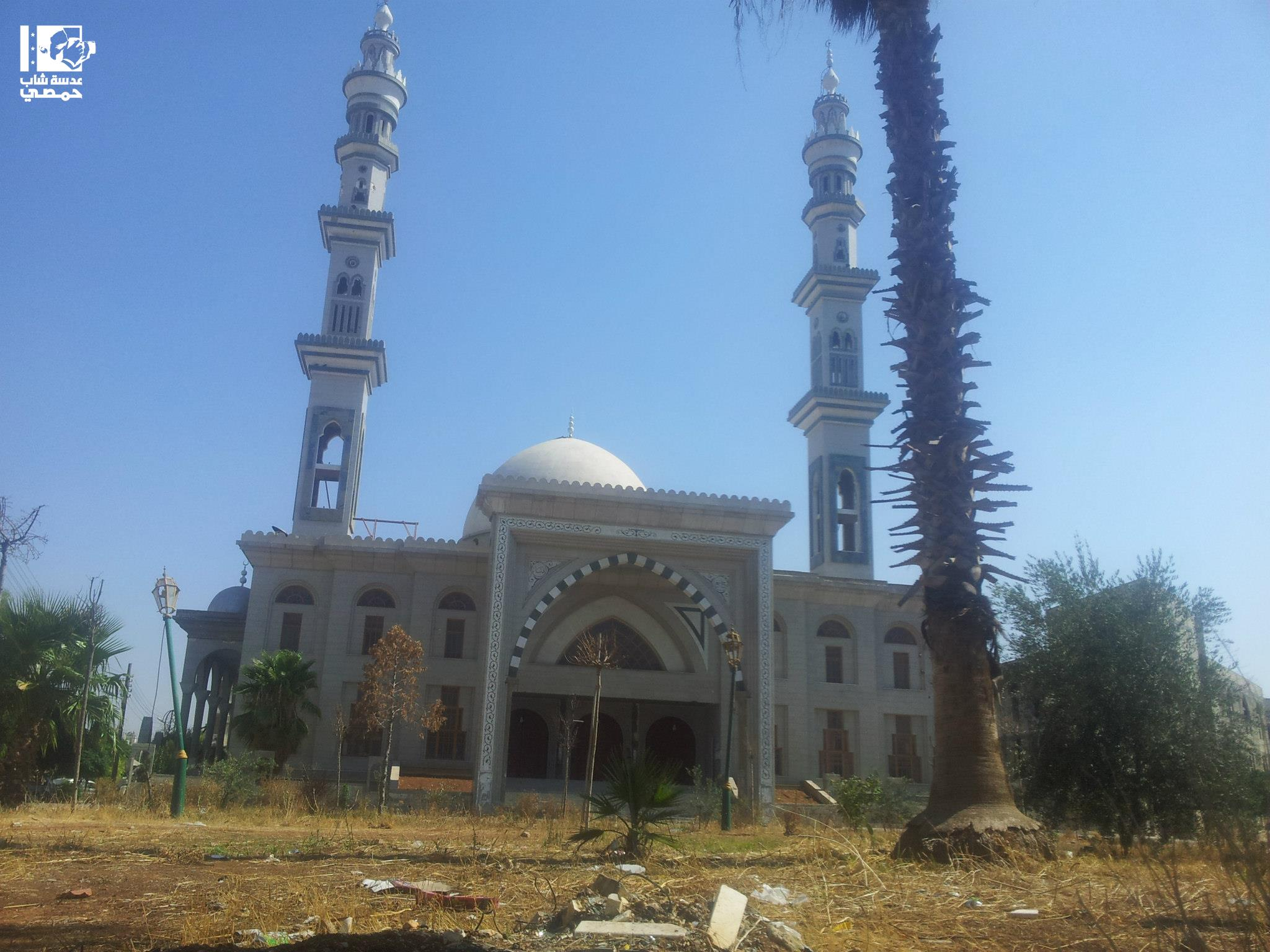
The mosque in 2012

== See also ==
- Atassi family
- Islam in Syria
- List of mosques in Syria
