= List of mosques in Syria =

This is a list of mosques in Syria.

Name	Images	City	Year (CE)	Remarks
Al-Omari Mosque		Bosra	636	Substantially destroyed during the Syrian civil war, c. 2012
Al-Omari Mosque		Daraa	636	
al-Shuaibiyah Mosque		Aleppo	637	Believed to be one of the oldest mosques in the Levant
Umayyad Mosque		Damascus	715	The National mosque of Syria, It is considered to be the oldest mosque still in use in its original form. It includes a shrine of John the Baptist (Yahya)
Great Mosque of Aleppo		Aleppo	715	Shrine of Zechariah, father of John the Baptist. The mosque and its minaret were partially destroyed in April 2013, during the Syrian Civil War
Great Mosque of Raqqa		Raqqa	772	In partial ruins since c. 2010s
Great Mosque of Hama		Hama	8th century	Destroyed during the 1982 Hama massacre and reconstructed in 2001
al-Nuqtah Mosque		Aleppo	944	
Great Mosque of al-Nuri		Homs	1129	
Nur al-Din Mosque		Hama	1172	
Al-Qaiqan Mosque		Aleppo	12th century	
Great Mosque of Maarat al-Numan		Maarat al-Numan (Idlib)	12th century	Partially destroyed during the 2016 Battle of Maarat al-Numan
Hanabila Mosque		Damascus	1210	Believed to be a miniature version of the Umayyad Mosque
Al-Jisr Al-Abyad Mosque		Damascus	1214	
Al-Rukniya Madrasa and Mosque		Damascus	1224	
Jarrah Mosque		Damascus	1233	
Aqsab Mosque		Damascus	1234	
Al-Tawba Mosque		Damascus	1235	
Great Mosque of Sarmin		Sarmin	1259	Significantly damaged in October 2023, during the Syrian civil war
Yalbugha Mosque		Damascus	1264	Repurposed for profane use in the 19th century; demolished in 1974; rebuilt on the same location in 2014
Mahmandar Mosque		Aleppo	1303	Minaret was damaged in 2012, during the Battle of Aleppo
Mosque of Prophet Huri		Cyrrhus	1314	Established during the Mamluk period around a historic Roman-period hexagonal tower tomb. Damaged in conflicts in 2018 and restored in 2020
Altun Bogha Mosque		Aleppo	1318	
Tankiz Mosque		Damascus	1318	rebuilt in 1951
Abu'l-Fida Mosque		Hama	1327	Mausoleum completed in 1327; the mosque during the Mamluk era
Al-Tawashi Mosque		Aleppo	1348	
Bahsita Mosque		Aleppo	1350	
Al-Sahibiyah Mosque		Aleppo	1350	
al-Otrush Mosque		Aleppo	1408	
Al-Saffahiyah Mosque		Aleppo	1425	
Al-Muallaq Mosque		Damascus	1458	
Ibn Arabi Mosque (Salimiyya Takiyya)		Damascus	1519	A Mosque and a Sufi takiyya
Khusruwiyah Mosque		Aleppo	1547	The mosque was entirely destroyed during the Battle of Aleppo in August 2014
Sulaymaniyya Takiyya		Damascus	1559	A Mosque and a Sufi takiyya
Al-Adiliyah Mosque		Aleppo	1566	The mosque was almost entirely destroyed during the Battle of Aleppo in the summer of c. 2015
Murad Pasha Mosque		Damascus	1568	Also known as the Naqshbandi Mosque after the Naqshbandi Sufi order.
Darwish Pasha Mosque		Damascus	1574	
Behramiyah Mosque		Aleppo	1583	Ottoman style; rebuilt many times
Sinan Pasha Mosque		Damascus	1590	Named after Sinan Pasha
Nabi Habeel Mosque		Damascus	1599	Tomb of Abel, son of Prophet Adam
Khalid ibn al-Walid Mosque		Homs	1912	Preserves the tomb of Khalid ibn al-Walid, one of the most prominent Sahaba
Al-Atassi Mosque		Homs	1913	Founded by the Al-Atassi family; completed in the late Ottoman style
Al-Salam Mosque		Homs	1980	
Tawhid Mosque		Aleppo	1981	
Sayyidah Ruqayya Mosque		Damascus	1985	A Twelver Shī‘ah Shrine of Fatimah, the youngest daughter of Husayn ibn Ali
Sayyidah Zaynab Mosque		Sayyida Zaynab	1991	A Twelver Shī‘ah shrine of Zaynab bint Ali, her grave's location is debated between this mosque and Cairo's mosque.
Ar-Rahman Mosque		Aleppo	1994	
Uwais al-Qarni Mosque		Raqqa	2003	A Twelver Shī‘ah mosque, Destroyed by the Islamic State on 31 May 2014
Mosque of Sultan Ibrahim Ibn Adham		Jableh	785	Contains a tomb dedicated to the Sufi mystic Ibrahim ibn Adham
Al-Iman Mosque		Damascus	?	

== See also ==
- Islam in Syria
- Lists of mosques
