= Al-Salam Mosque, Odesa =

Mosque in Odesa, Ukraine

Al-Salam Mosque
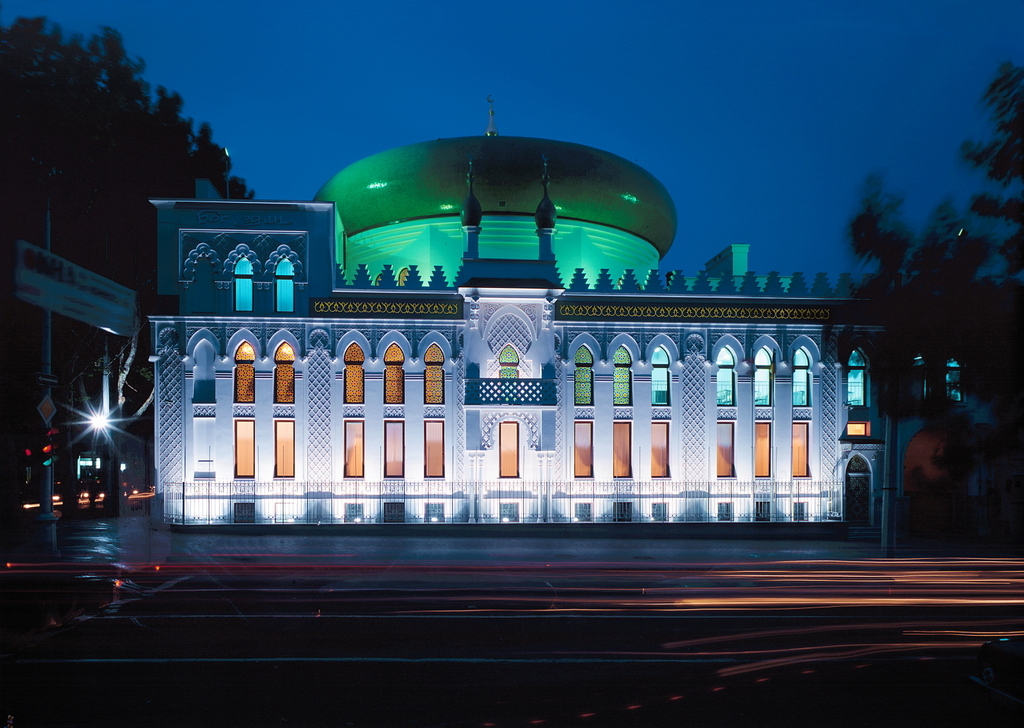
- The mosque, lit, at night

Religion
- Affiliation: Islam
- Status: Active

Location
- Location: Odesa, Ukraine
- Interactive map of Al-Salam Mosque
- Coordinates: 46°28′22″N 30°44′22″E

Architecture
- Type: Mosque
- Completed: 2001
- Dome: 1

The Al-Salam Mosque and Arabian Cultural Center (Ukrainian: Арабський культурний центр) are located in Odesa, Ukraine. The cultural center and mosque were opened in June 2001.

== History ==
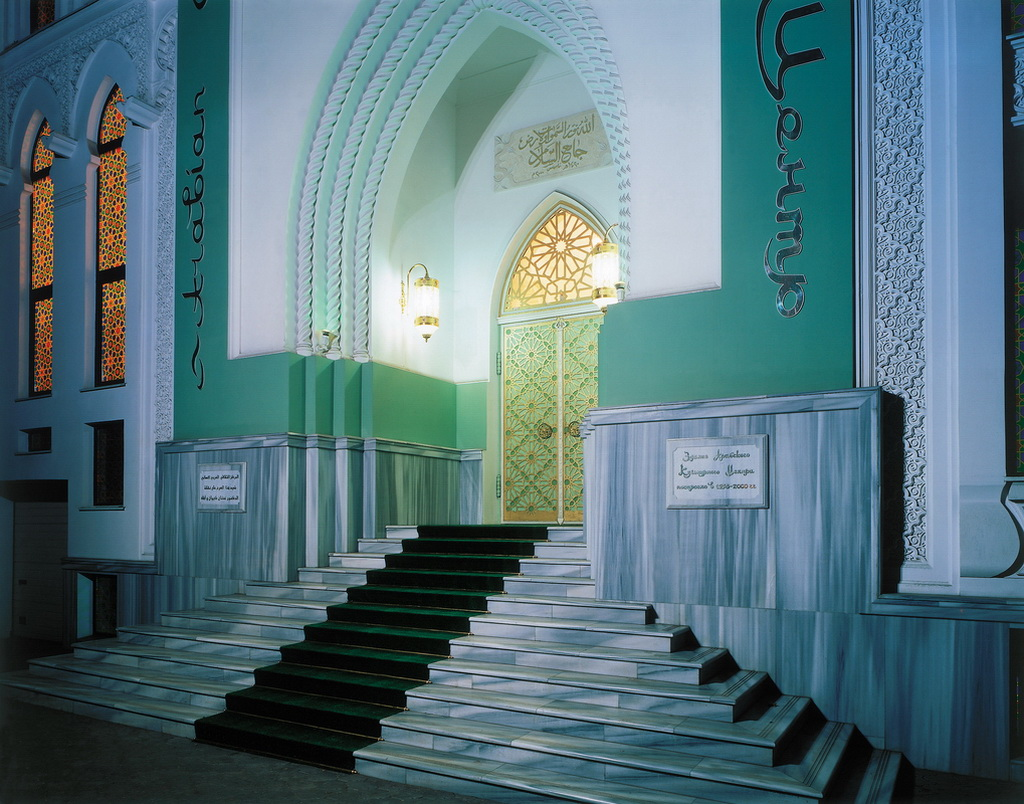
Entrance to the mosque

Odesa Muslims have a long tradition. The city of Odesa was built on the site of an ancient Tatar settlement called Hadzhibey. The settlement was founded by Hacı I Giray, the Khan of Crimea, in 1240, and originally named after him as Hacıbey (pronounced the same as Hadzhibey).

A Tatar mosque, built by renowned architect Karbalayi Safikhan Karabakhi, was located in the center of the city, alongside it a Muslim cemetery. With the arrival of Soviet power, life dramatically changed for Odesa Muslims. Tatar mullah, Sabirzyan Safarov, was shot; the mosque was closed and later destroyed. The Muslim cemetery was also razed.

The Arabian Cultural Center was constructed at the expense of the Syrian businessman, Kivan Adnan. The center operates a free school and library for teaching Arabic to everyone, regardless of age or nationality.
