= Al-Saffahiyah Mosque =

Mosque in Aleppo, Syria

Saffahiyah Mosque
- جَامِع السَّفَّاحِيَّة
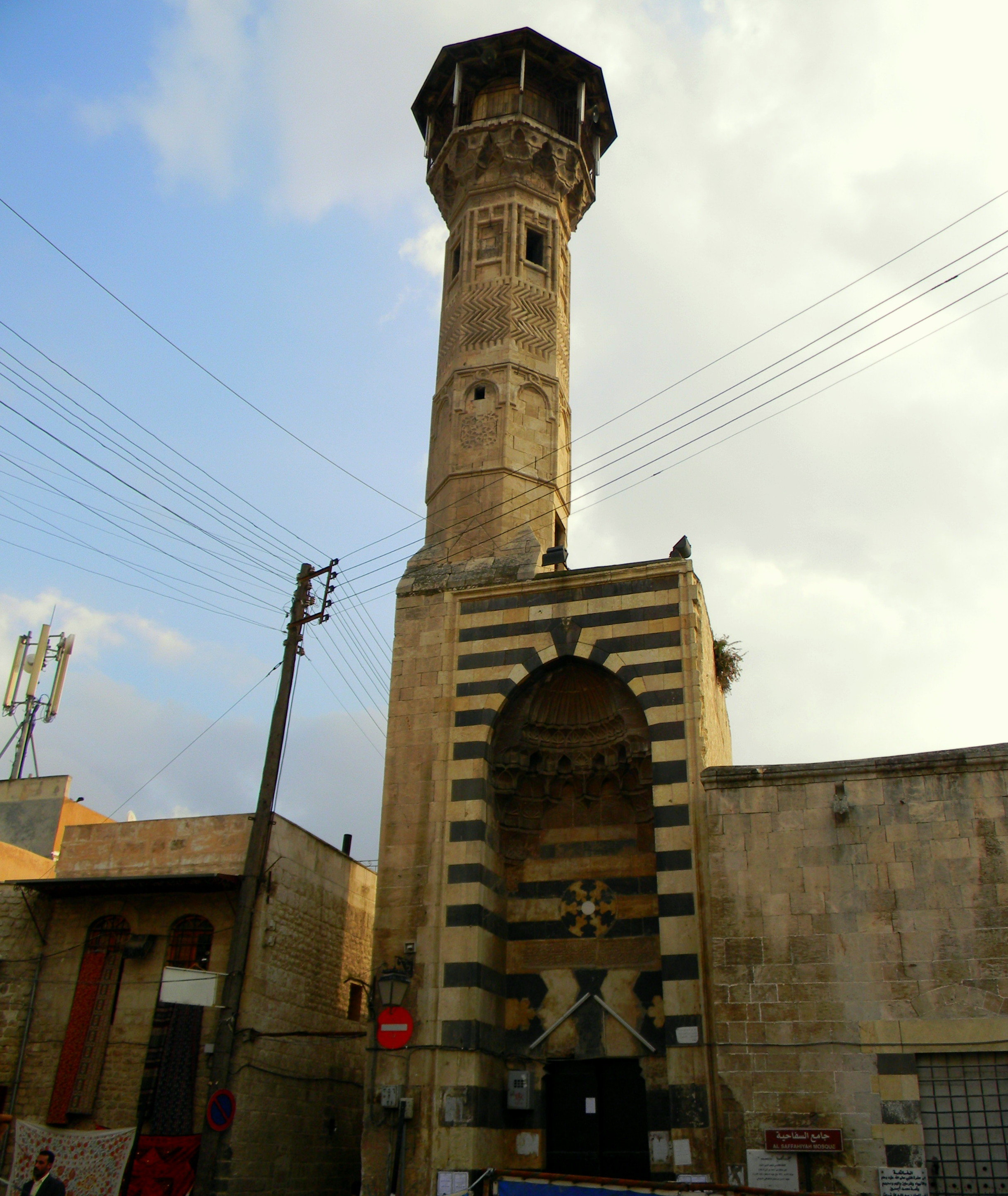
- The mosque and minaret in 2001

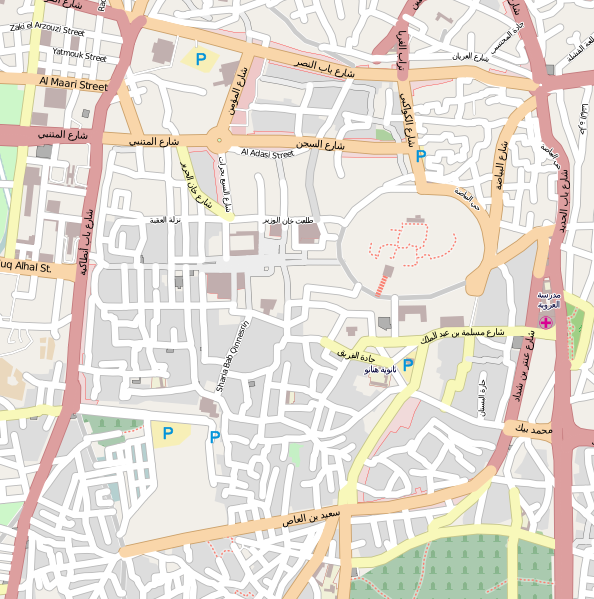
- Location of the mosque in the Ancient City of Aleppo

Religion
- Affiliation: Islam
- Ecclesiastical or organisational status: Mosque and madrasa
- Status: Active

Location
- Location: Aleppo
- Country: Syria
- Interactive map of Saffahiyah Mosque
- Coordinates: 36°11′49″N 37°09′38″E

Architecture
- Type: Islamic architecture
- Style: Mamluk
- Founder: Ahmed bin Saleh bin Al-Saffah
- Completed: 828 AH (1424/1425 CE)

Specifications
- Minaret: 1
- Materials: Stone; marble
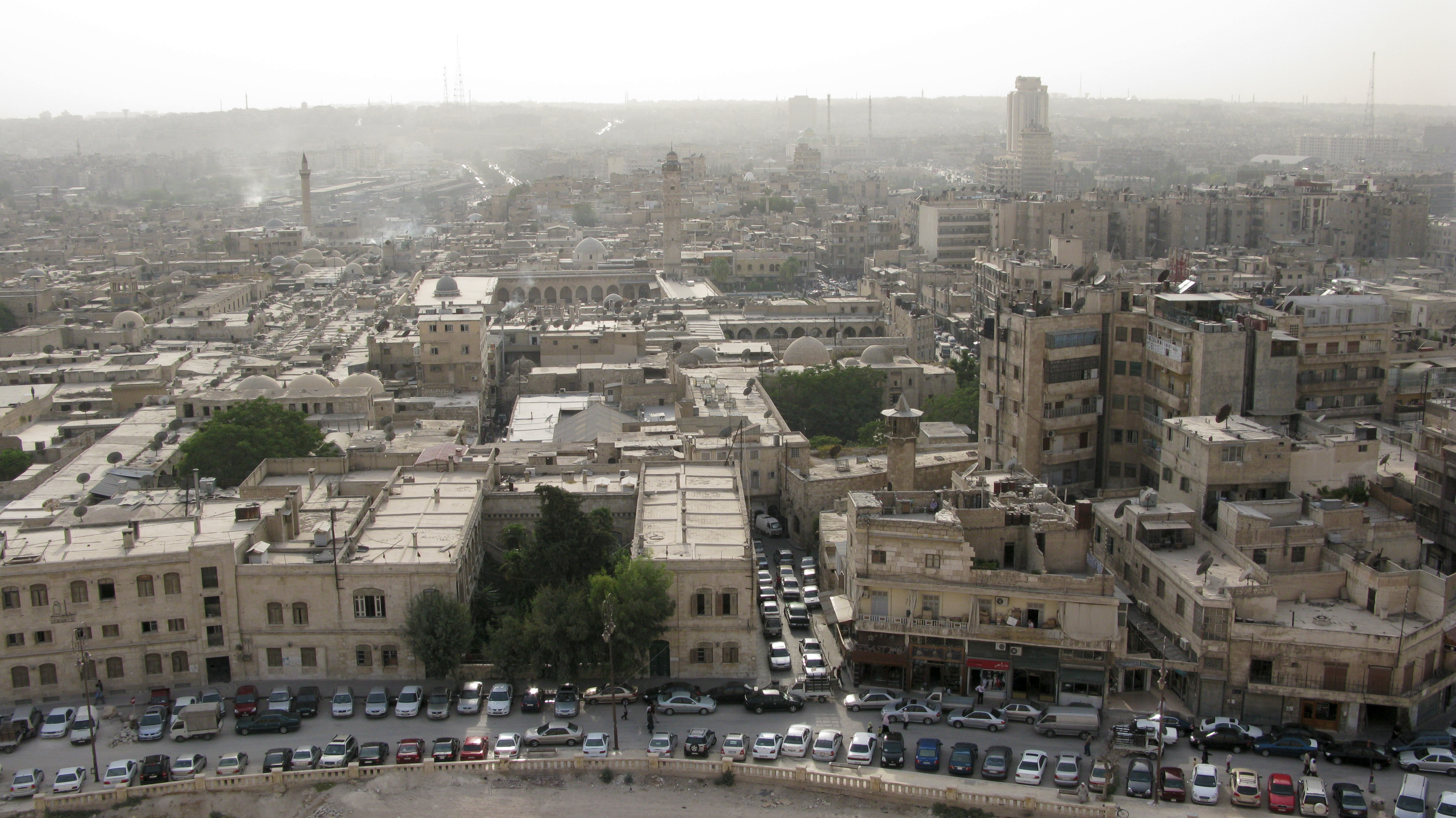
- Ancient Aleppo

UNESCO World Heritage Site
- Official name: Ancient City of Aleppo
- Location: Aleppo, Syria
- Includes: Citadel of Aleppo, Al-Madina Souq
- Criteria: Cultural: (iii), (iv)
- Reference: 21
- Inscription: 1986 (10th Session)
- Endangered: 2013–2020
- Area: 364 ha (1.41 sq mi)

The Al-Saffahiyah Mosque (Arabic: جَامِع السَّفَّاحِيَّة, romanized: Jāmiʿ as-Saffāḥīyah) is a mosque and madrasa in Aleppo, located to the south-west of the Citadel, at "Al-Jalloum" district of the Ancient City of Aleppo, a World Heritage Site, to the east of Al-Shibani Church-School. The mosque was built in 828 AH (1424/1425 CE) under the patronage of Ahmed bin Saleh bin Al-Saffah on the ruins of an old mill, during the Mamluk period.

The mosque is marked with its single octagonal minaret over the entrance, decorated with the fine carvings of the Mamluk architecture. The mihrab is made of marble. The mosque was partially renovated in 1925.

== Gallery ==
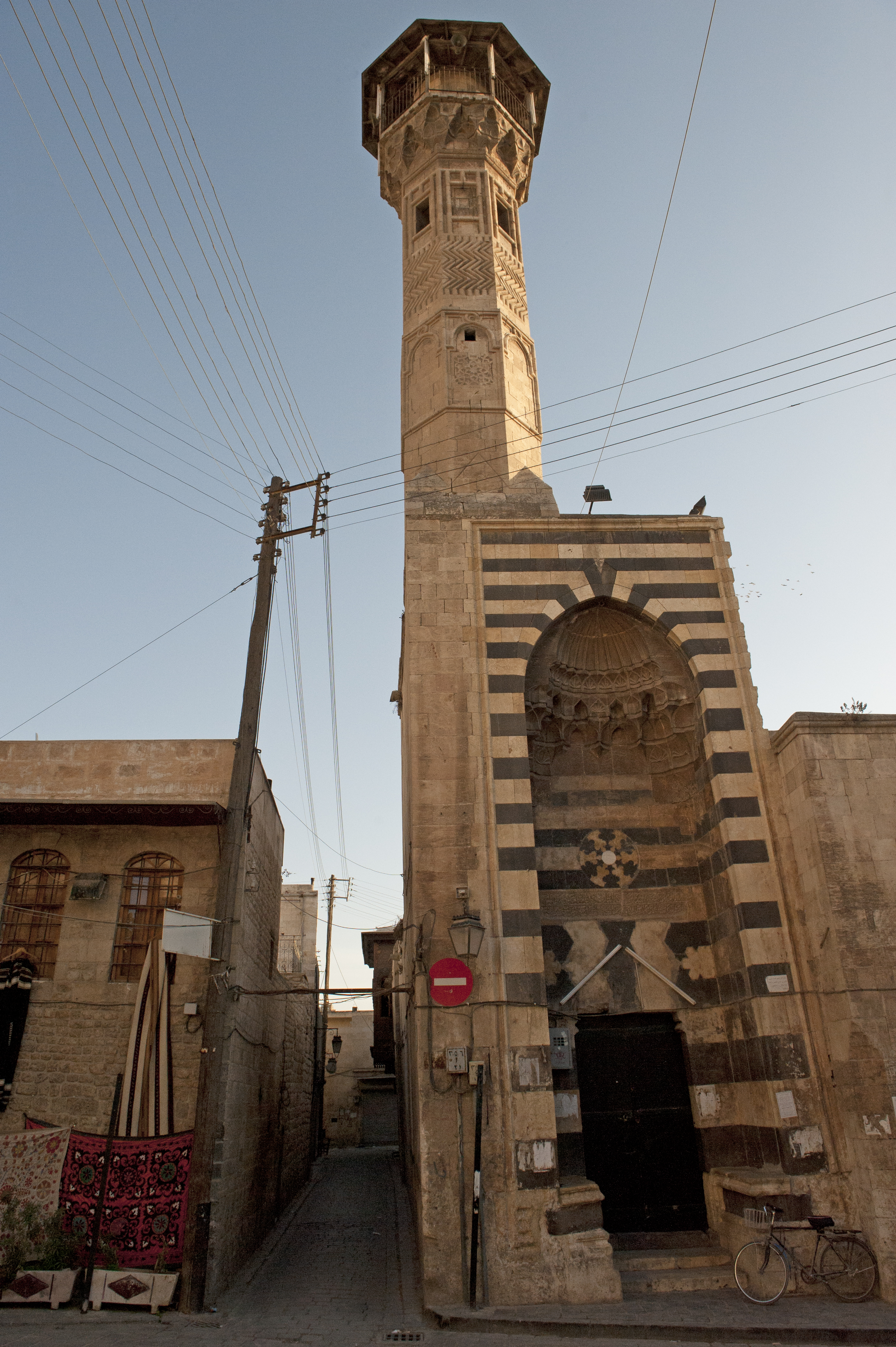
The mosque façade and minaret

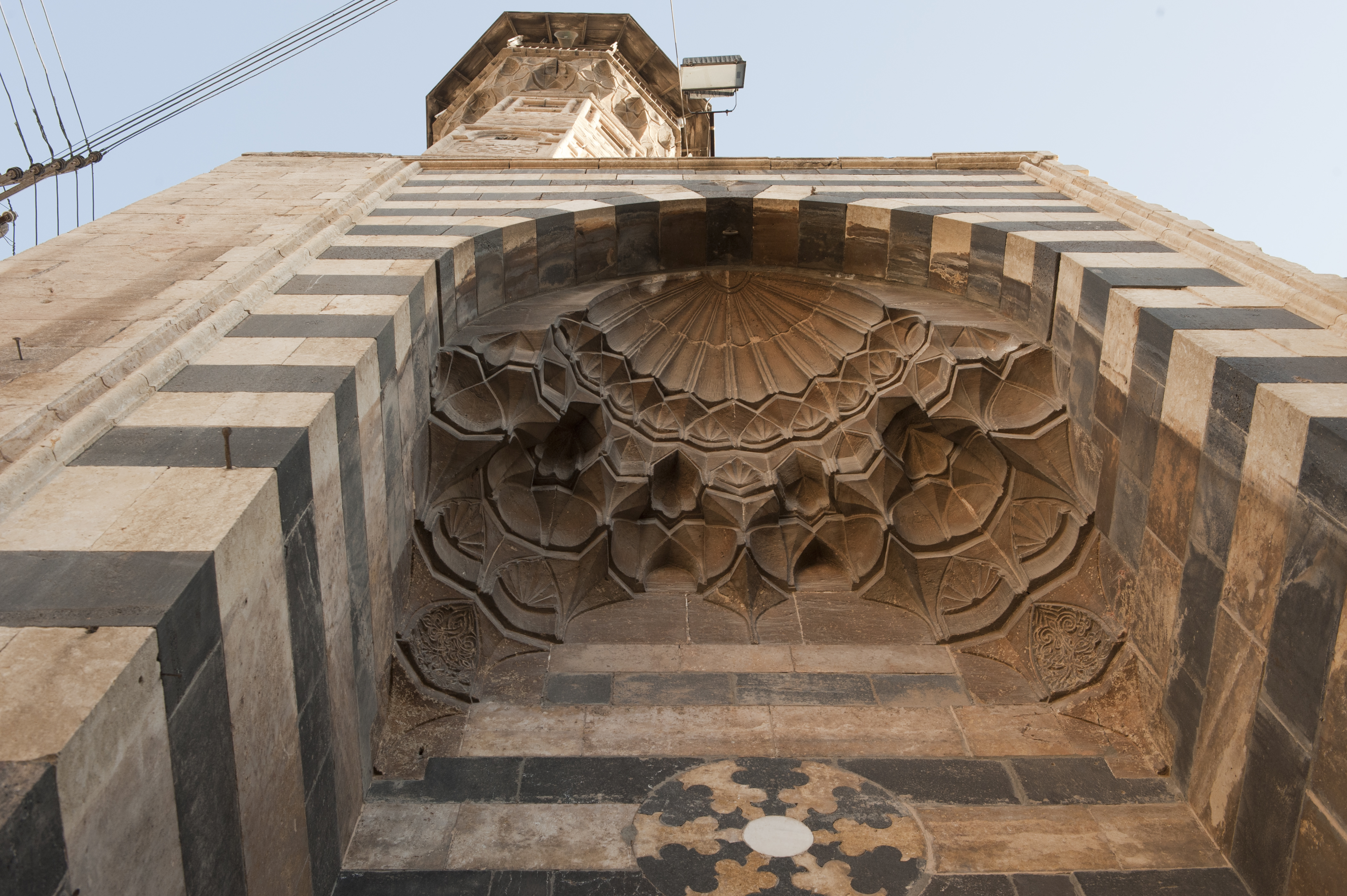
The muqarnas at the mosque entrance

== See also ==
- Islam in Syria
- List of mosques in Aleppo
- List of mosques in Syria
