= Al-Salam Mosque, Syria =

Mosque in Homs, Syria

Al-Salam Mosque

Religion
- Affiliation: Islam
- Ecclesiastical or organisational status: Mosque
- Status: Active

Location
- Location: Qarabis, Homs
- Country: Syria
- Administration: Karabyss Muslim Community

Architecture
- Architect: Shawki Tawakkol
- Type: Islamic architecture
- Style: Mamluk
- Completed: 1980

Specifications
- Dome: 1
- Minaret: 1

The Al-Salam Mosque (Arabic pronunciation: Masjid al-Salam), also known as the Dar al-Salam Mosque, is a mosque located in the Qarabis neighborhood of Homs, Syria. It was designed by Shawki Tawokkol and construction was completed in 1980, partially with the support of local volunteers. The Karabyss Muslim Community administers the mosque.

== Overview ==
The al-Salam Mosque consists of a square layout and a rectangular courtyard surrounded by an arcade precedes the mosque's entrance, which is faces Khalaf al-Ahmar Street. Adjacent to the mosque is its three-story minaret. The minaret consists of alternating black-and-white stone in the Mamluk ablaq style.

The mosque was reportedly damaged in the fighting during the ongoing Syrian civil war.

== See also ==
- Islam in Syria
- List of mosques in Syria
