= Ibn al-Qamar =

Tunisian Berber merchant (1326–1398)

Nūr ad-Dīn 'Abd al-'Azīz Ibn al-Qamar (Arabic: نور الدين عبد العزيز بن القمر) better known just as Ibn al-Qamar (1326 – 9 December 1398), was a Tunisian Berber Muslim prince and wealthy trader who profited immensely from the North African and Mediterranean trade routes. He was also a master falconer and known for designing elaborate labyrinths such as those discovered beneath the ruins of Qala’at ash-Shems, south of present-day Teucheira.
