= Nurettin Yardımcı =

Turkish archaeologist and high-ranked bureaucrat

- Born: 5 March 1944 (age 82); Şanlıurfa
- Occupations: Archaeologist, bureaucrat
- Awards: 1988: Order of Leopold II, 1988: President of Italy Award 2008: Order of the Star of Italian Solidarity

Academic background
- Education: University of Ankara

Nurettin Yardımcı (born March 5, 1944, in Şanlıurfa) is a Turkish archaeologist and high-ranked bureaucrat who has served in the Ministry of Culture of Turkey and under the Prime Minister of Turkey. He has been leading the Harran excavation in Şanlıurfa, Turkey since 1983.

== Education ==
Yardımcı graduated from the department of archaeology at the University of Ankara in 1968, specializing in protohistory and Near Eastern archaeology. He received his PhD from the same department in 1982.

== Career ==
He served as the Director of Bodrum Museum of Underwater Archaeology between 1973 and 1975, and as the Director of Antiquities and Museums in the Ministry of Culture of Turkey between 1979 and 1988, continuing for another period between 1989 and 1991. He was later appointed as a chief adviser to the Prime Minister of Turkey in 1997, and as the Director-General of Foundations of Turkey in 1999.

While in charge of the Directorate of Antiquities and Museums, he has supervised numerous exhibitions abroad including Land of Civilizations: Turkey and Suleyman the Magnificent. In addition, he has held several international positions as a Board Member in the Turkish National Committee of UNESCO and Head of the Turkish National Committee of the International Council of Museums.

He has also been leading the Harran excavation since 1983. In 2001, he assumed a new project and started an archaeological survey in the plain of Suruç (near Harran).

== Honours ==
- 1988: Order of Leopold II
- 1988: President of Italy Award
- 2008: Order of the Star of Italian Solidarity

== Notable works ==
- Yardimci, Nurettin (2004) Harran Ovası Yüzey Araştırması I-II / Archaeological Survey in the Harran Plain I-II, Istanbul: Arkeoloji ve Sanat Yayınları (in Turkish and English)
- Yardimci, Nurettin (2006) Harran: Mezopotamya'ya Açılan Kapı, Istanbul: Ege Yayınları (in Turkish)
- Yardimci, Nurettin (1973) Bodrum (Halikarnassos) ve Müze Rehberi, Istanbul: TTOK Yayınları
