= Nur al-Din Mosque =

Mosque in Hama, Syria

Nur Al-Din Mosque
- جَامِعُ نُورِ الدِّينِ
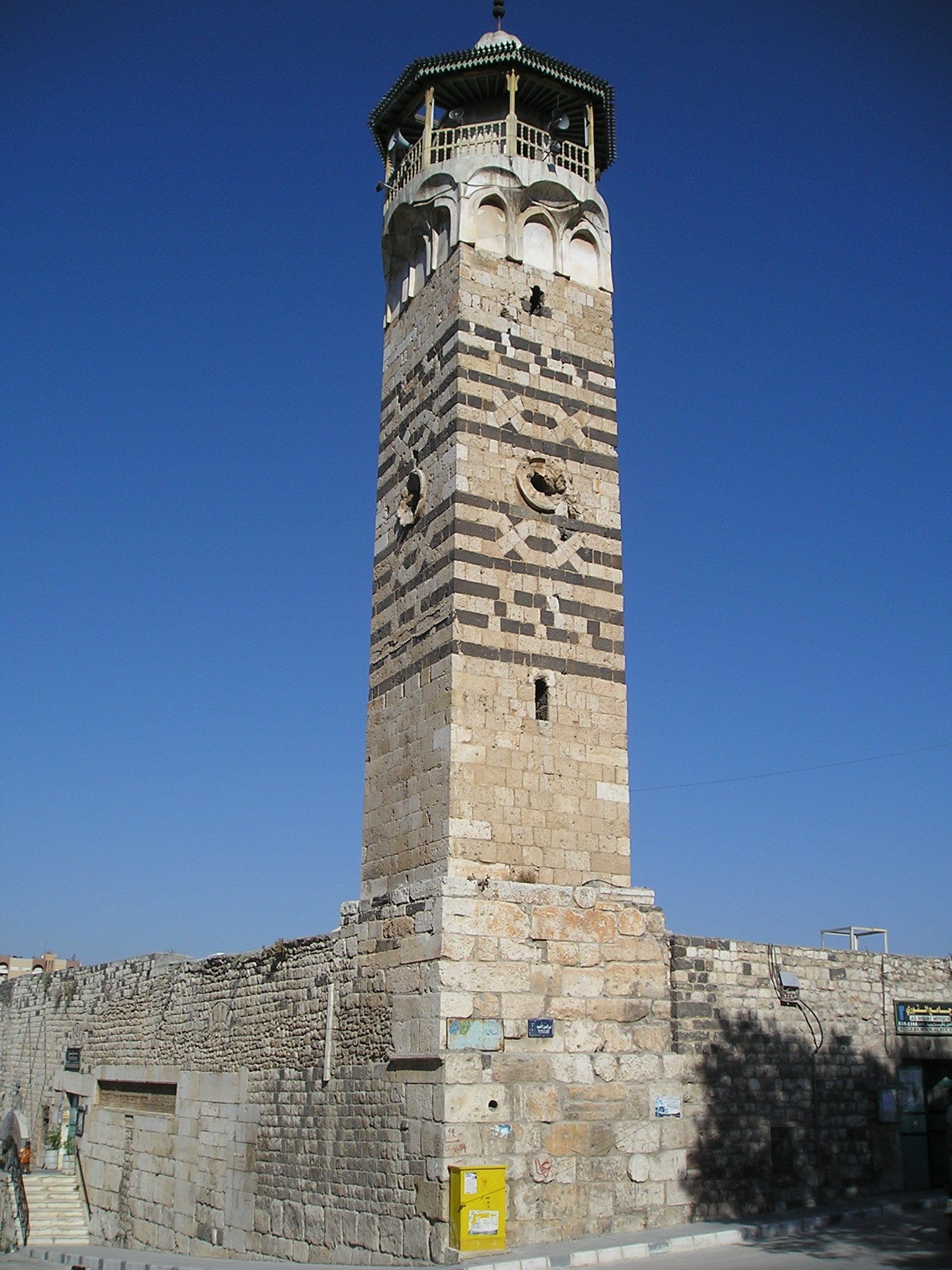
- The minaret of Nur al-Din Mosque

- Location of the mosque in Syria

Religion
- Affiliation: Sunni Islam
- Ecclesiastical or organizational status: Mosque
- Status: Active

Location
- Location: Hama
- Country: Syria
- Interactive map of Nur Al-Din Mosque
- Coordinates: 35°8′6″N 36°45′9″E

Architecture
- Type: Mosque
- Style: Zengid
- Founder: Nur al-Din
- Completed: 1172 CE

Specifications
- Minaret: 1
- Materials: Basalt; limestone; tiles

The Nur Al-Din Mosque (Arabic: جَامِع نُور ٱلدِّين, romanized: Jāmiʿ Nūr ad-Dīn) is a Zengid-era mosque in Hama, Syria. It was founded by Nur al-Din in 1163-64 CE. It also contained a historic minbar from the same date, which has subsequently been relocated to the local Hama Museum.

The mosque was profoundly damaged in the 1982 shelling of the city and subsequently restored to its current state.

== Gallery ==
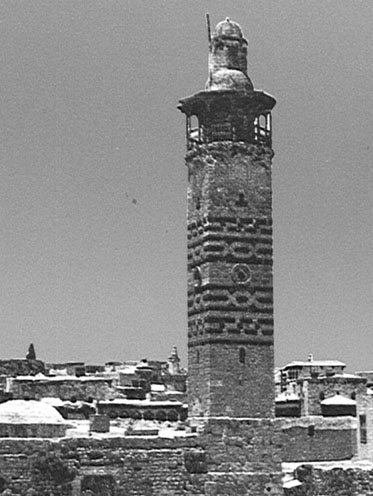
Prior to 1982 shelling

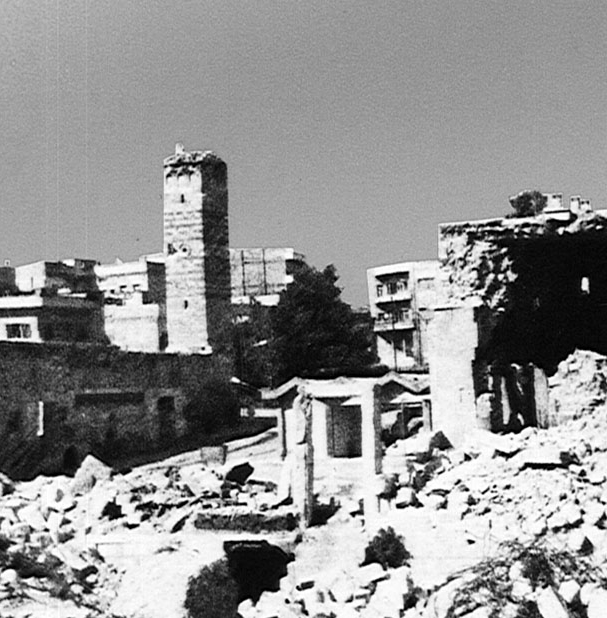
After shelling

== See also ==
- Sunni Islam in Syria
- List of mosques in Syria

== Bibliography ==
- Rihawi, Abdul Qader (1979). Arabic Islamic Architecture: Its Characteristics and Traces in Syria. Publications of the Ministry of Culture and National Leadership.
