= Noureddine Sammoud =

Tunisian poet and academic (1932–2022)

- نور الدين صمود
- Born: 1932; Kelibia, Nabeul Governorate, French Protectorate of Tunisia, France
- Died: 11 January 2022 (aged 89); Kelibia, Nabeul Governorate, Tunisia
- Other names: Nūr al-Dīn Ṣammūd
- Occupation: Poet

Noureddine Sammoud (Arabic: نور الدين صمود; 1932 – 11 January 2022) was a Tunisian poet and academic.

== Life and career ==
Born in Kelibia, Sammoud studied at the Al-Zaytuna Mosque and at the Cairo University, before getting a master's degree in literature at the Lebanese University in 1959. He started his poetic production in 1953, and took part in several national and international literary festivals. His poetry collections, which are generally linked to the Neo-romanticism, were translated in various foreign languages and spanned different styles. During his life he received numerous awards, including the National Merit Award in 1970 and the prize of the Ministry of Cultural Affairs in 1982.

He often collaborated with radio as a host and a writer, and was a professor of literature at the Higher Institute of Theology (a department of the University of Ez-Zitouna) and later at the Higher Institute of Music of Tunisia (ISMT). His poetries have often been put to music by prominent artists such as Slah Mosbah and Ali Riahi. Sammoud died in Kelibia on 11 January 2022, at the age of 89.
