= Al-Qaiqan Mosque =

Mosque in Aleppo, Syria

al-Qaiqan Mosque
- جَامِع الْقَيْقَان
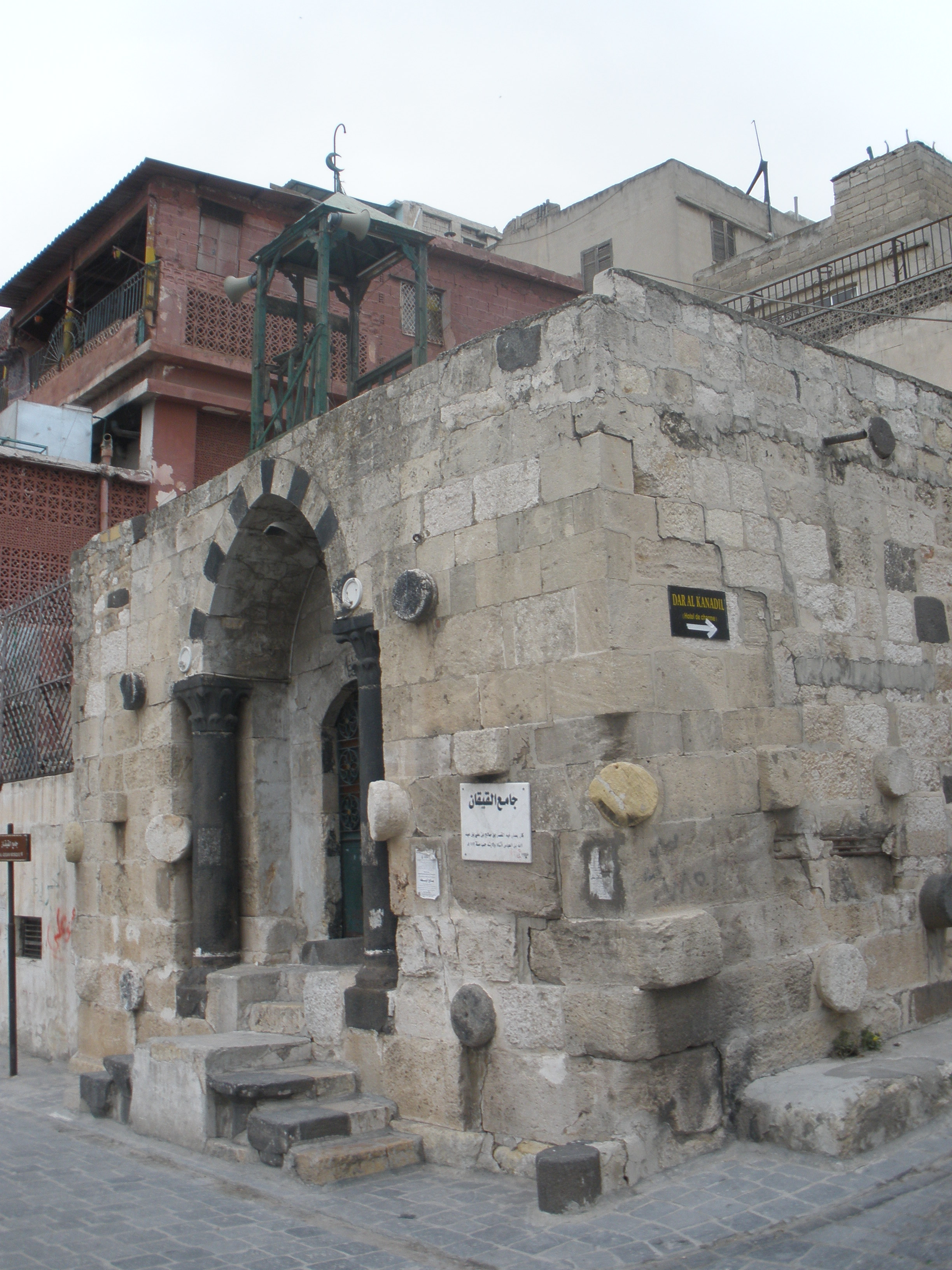
- The mosque in 2011

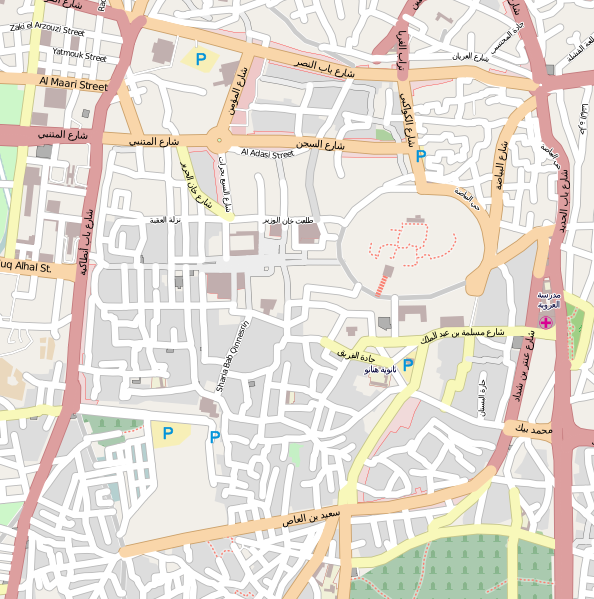
- Location of the mosque in the Ancient City of Aleppo

Religion
- Affiliation: Islam
- Ecclesiastical or organisational status: Mosque
- Status: Active

Location
- Location: Al-Aqabah district, Aleppo
- Country: Syria
- Interactive map of al-Qaiqan Mosque
- Coordinates: 36°12′04″N 37°09′09″E

Architecture
- Type: Islamic architecture
- Completed: 12th century CE
- Materials: Stone; basalt
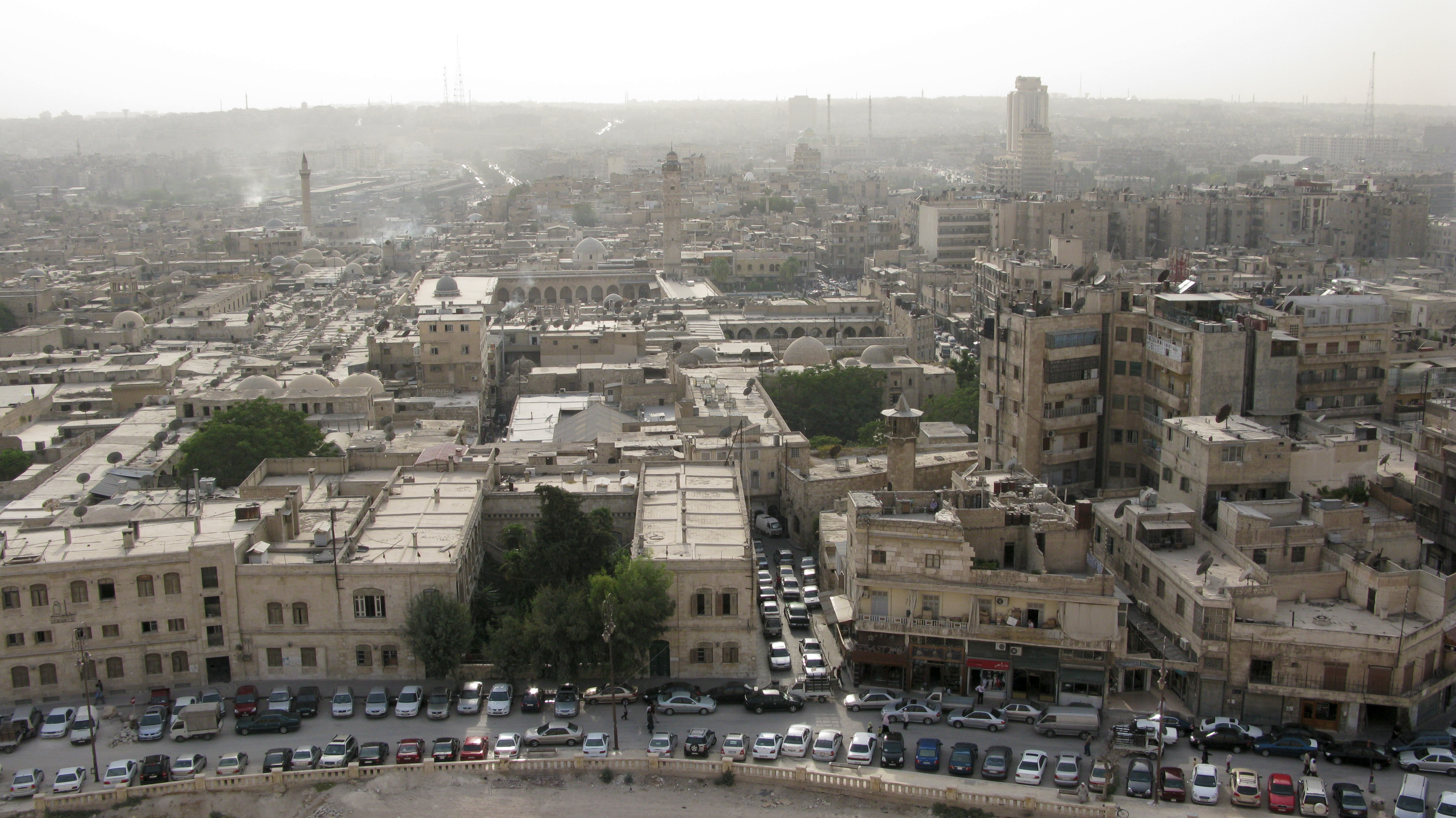
- Ancient Aleppo

UNESCO World Heritage Site
- Official name: Ancient City of Aleppo
- Location: Aleppo, Syria
- Includes: Citadel of Aleppo, Al-Madina Souq
- Criteria: Cultural: (iii), (iv)
- Reference: 21
- Inscription: 1986 (10th Session)
- Endangered: 2013–2020
- Area: 364 ha (1.41 sq mi)

The Al-Qaiqan Mosque (Arabic: جَامِع الْقَيْقَان, romanized: Jāmiʿ al-Qayqān, lit. 'Mosque of the Crows') is a mosque in Aleppo, Syria. It is located in the western part of the Ancient City of Aleppo, a World Heritage Site, within the historic walls of the city, to the north of the Gate of Antioch.

== History ==
In ancient times, the building was a Hittite pagan temple. It was converted into a mosque during the 12th century. Old carved stones with Hittite inscriptions were used in the construction of the mosque. Two old basalt columns are at the main entrance of the building. On the southern wall of the mosque is a stone block inscribed with Anatolian hieroglyphs. Both Telipinu and Talmi-Šarruma, descendants of Šuppiluliuma I, are mentioned in the inscription on the south wall of the mosque.

The mosque was enlarged in 1965 and entirely renovated in 1996.

== See also ==
- Islam in Syria
- List of mosques in Aleppo
- List of mosques in Syria
