= Al-Shu'aybiyya Mosque =

Mosque in Aleppo, Syria

al-Shuaibiyah Mosque
- جَامِع الشُّعَيْبِيَّة
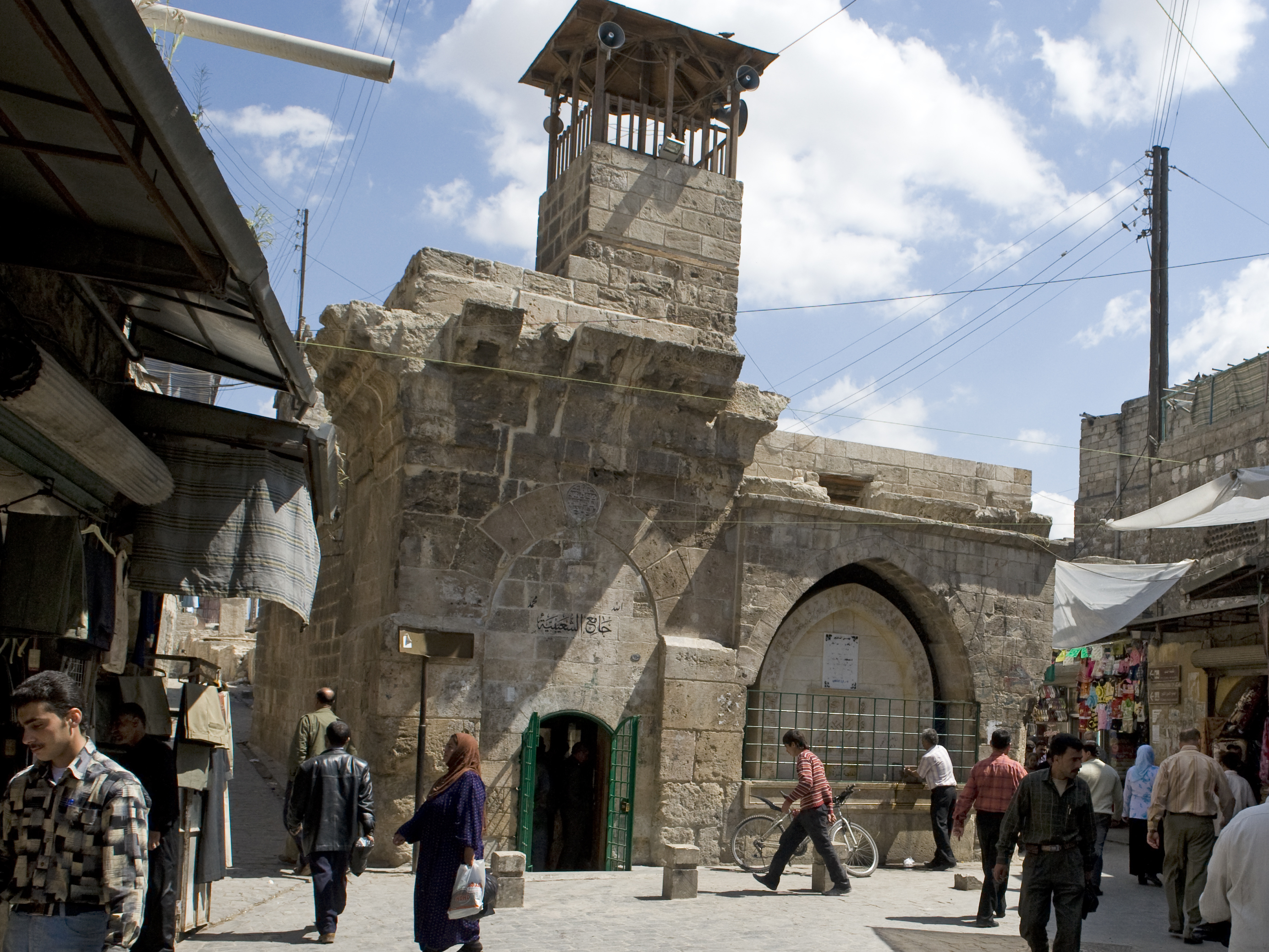
- The mosque in 2009, before the 2016 Battle of Aleppo

Religion
- Affiliation: Islam
- Ecclesiastical or organisational status: Mosque
- Status: Active

Location
- Location: al-Aqabah district, Aleppo
- Country: Syria
- Interactive map of al-Shuaibiyah Mosque
- Coordinates: 36°11′58″N 37°09′10″E

Architecture
- Type: Islamic architecture
- Completed: 1150–1 CE
- Materials: Stone
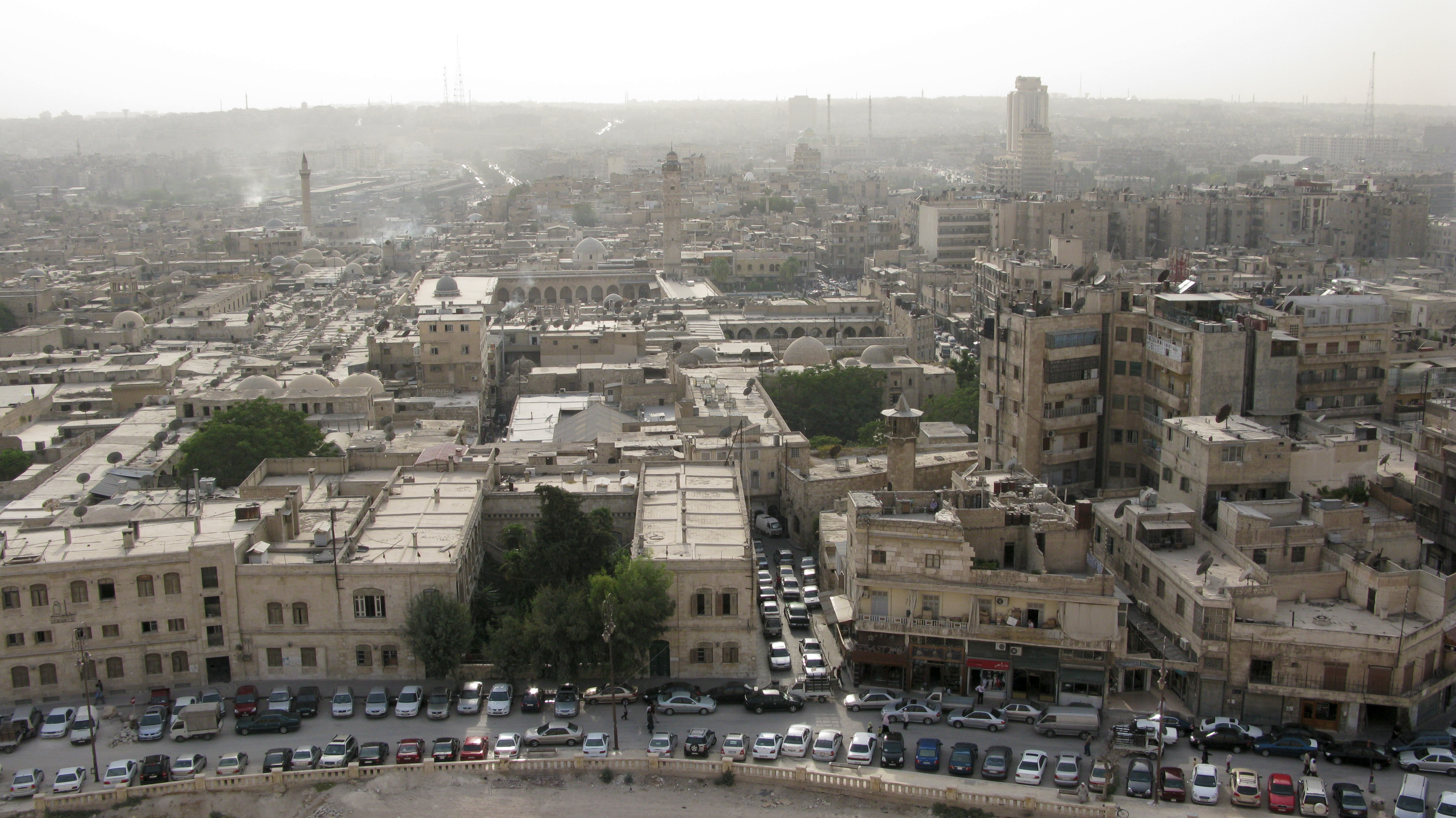
- Ancient Aleppo

UNESCO World Heritage Site
- Official name: Ancient City of Aleppo
- Location: Aleppo, Syria
- Includes: Citadel of Aleppo, Al-Madina Souq
- Criteria: Cultural: (iii), (iv)
- Reference: 21
- Inscription: 1986 (10th Session)
- Endangered: 2013–2020
- Area: 364 ha (1.41 sq mi)

The al-Shu'aybiyya Mosque (Arabic: جَامِع الشُّعَيْبِيَّة, romanized: Jāmiʿ aš-Šuʿaybīyah), also known as the Qastal al-Shu'aybiyya, the al-Shu'aybiyya Madrasa, or popularly as the al-Tuteh Mosque (Arabic: جَامِع التُّوتَة, romanized: Jāmiʿ at-Tūtah, lit. 'Mosque of the Mulberry tree'), is a mosque and historic monument in Aleppo, Syria. It is located in the western part of historic Aleppo, a World Heritage Site, near the Antioch Gate. It was built in 1150–1 by the Zengid ruler Nur al-Din. It replaced an earlier building on the same site which had been the first mosque in the city.

== History ==
The current building replaced an earlier mosque on the same site that is now lost. This small mosque had been the first mosque in the city and it commemorated the spot, just inside the Antioch Gate, where Muslims first prayed inside the city after capturing it from the Byzantines in 637. Its original construction may have incorporated a Roman/Byzantine tetrapylon that stood on this site and that might have inspired the future building here. The mosque was renovated in the 10th century by a local Shi'a patron, Abu'l Hasan al-Ghadairi (d. 925).

In 1150–1, Nur al-Din (r. 1146–1174) transformed this site into a new Sunni and Shafi'i madrasa headed by an Andalusi jurist known as Shaykh Shu'ayb. The act of transforming a Shi'a mosque into a Sunni madrasa was part of Nur al-Din's wider campaign against Shi'ism, which was prevalent in Aleppo at the time, during a time of tension between Shi'as and Sunnis. The present-day structure dates from Nur al-Din's construction, though much of the former madrasa structure has now disappeared as well.

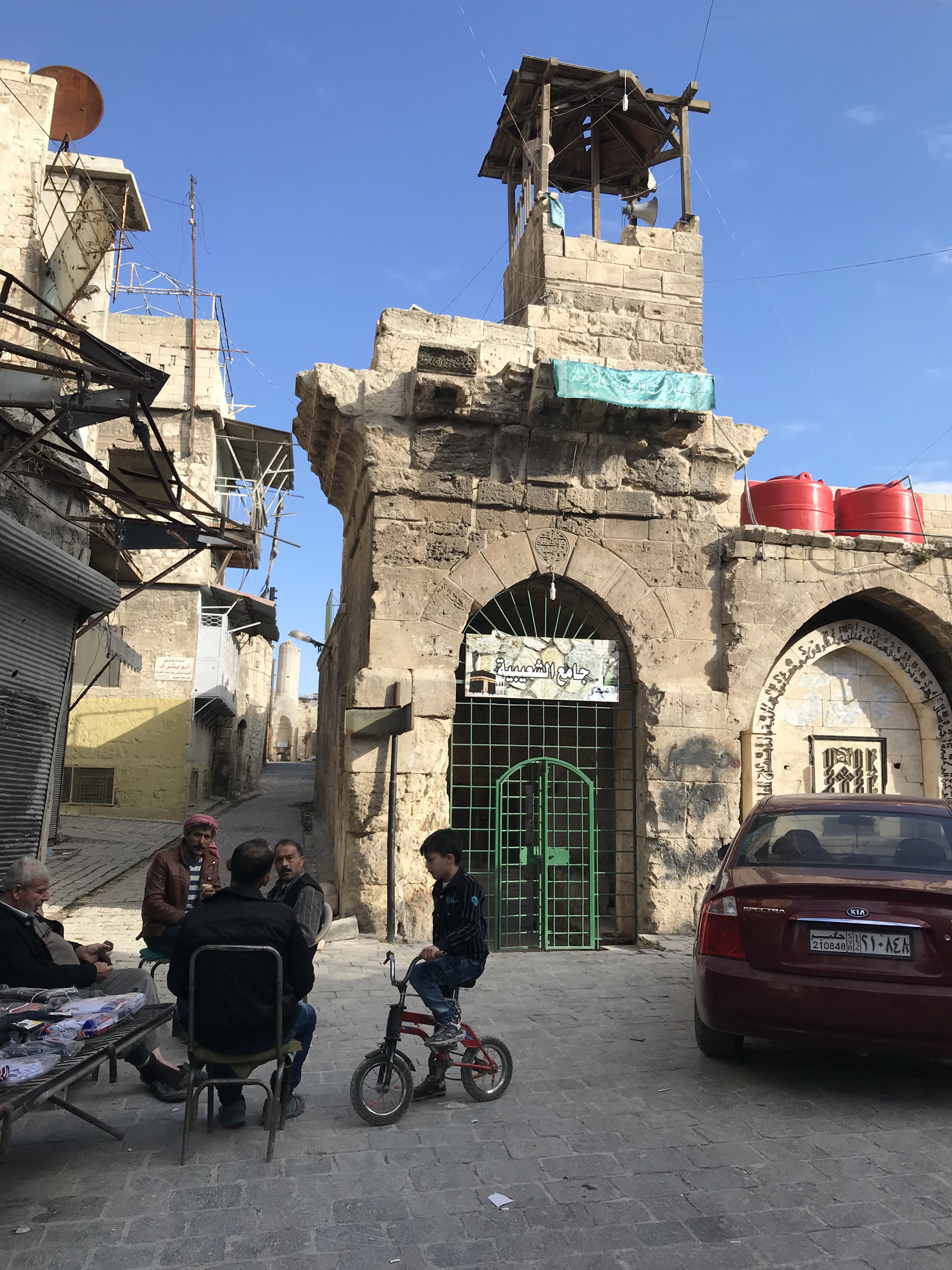
The mosque in 2017, after the 2016 Battle of Aleppo

== Architecture ==
The building is unusual in Islamic architecture. The present-day historical remains are small structure that consists of a partially-preserved façade with an entrance gate on one side—leading to the former madrasa, now lost—and a wall fountain or sabil.

The most notable feature of the façade is the presence of a richly-decorated entablature in Classical style along the top of the wall. The stone-carved motifs of this entablature appear to imitate ancient Roman or Byzantine decoration. It is also carved with an Arabic inscription containing an excerpt from the Qur'an (Surah 9:18). Current scholarship agrees that the façade's decoration dates from Nur al-Din's construction circa 1150. This has led to scholarly debate about the presence and meaning of a possible "classical revival" in the architecture of 12th-century Syria. Islamic art historian Julian Raby argues that while classical elements and motifs are visible in multiple Islamic monuments built across the wider region around this time, they likely had different local motivations.

== See also ==
- Islam in Syria
- List of mosques in Aleppo
- List of mosques in Syria
- List of oldest mosques in the Levant
