= Behramiyah Mosque =

Mosque in Aleppo, Syria

- جَامِع الْبَهْرَمِيَّة
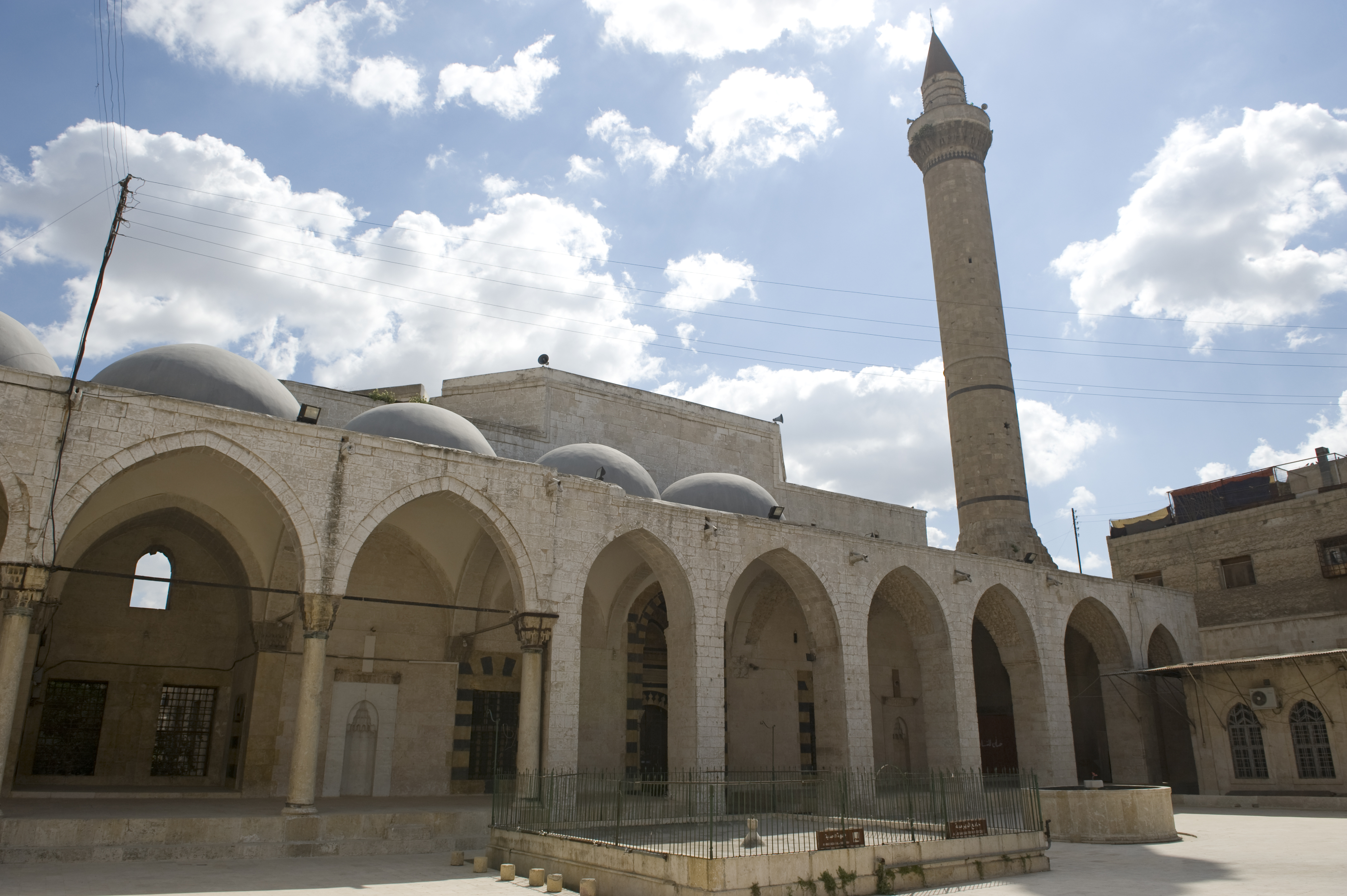
- The mosque viewed from the sahn, in 2009

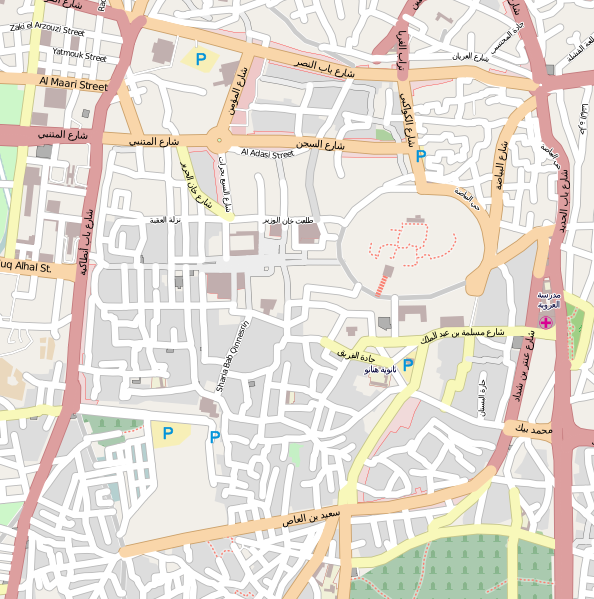
- Location of the mosque in the Ancient City of Aleppo

Religion
- Affiliation: Islam
- Ecclesiastical or organisational status: Mosque
- Status: Active

Location
- Location: Aleppo
- Country: Syria
- Interactive map of Behramiyah Mosque
- Coordinates: 36°11′54″N 37°09′17″E

Architecture
- Type: Islamic architecture
- Style: Ottoman
- Completed: 1583 CE

Specifications
- Dome: 1
- Minaret: 1
- Materials: Stone
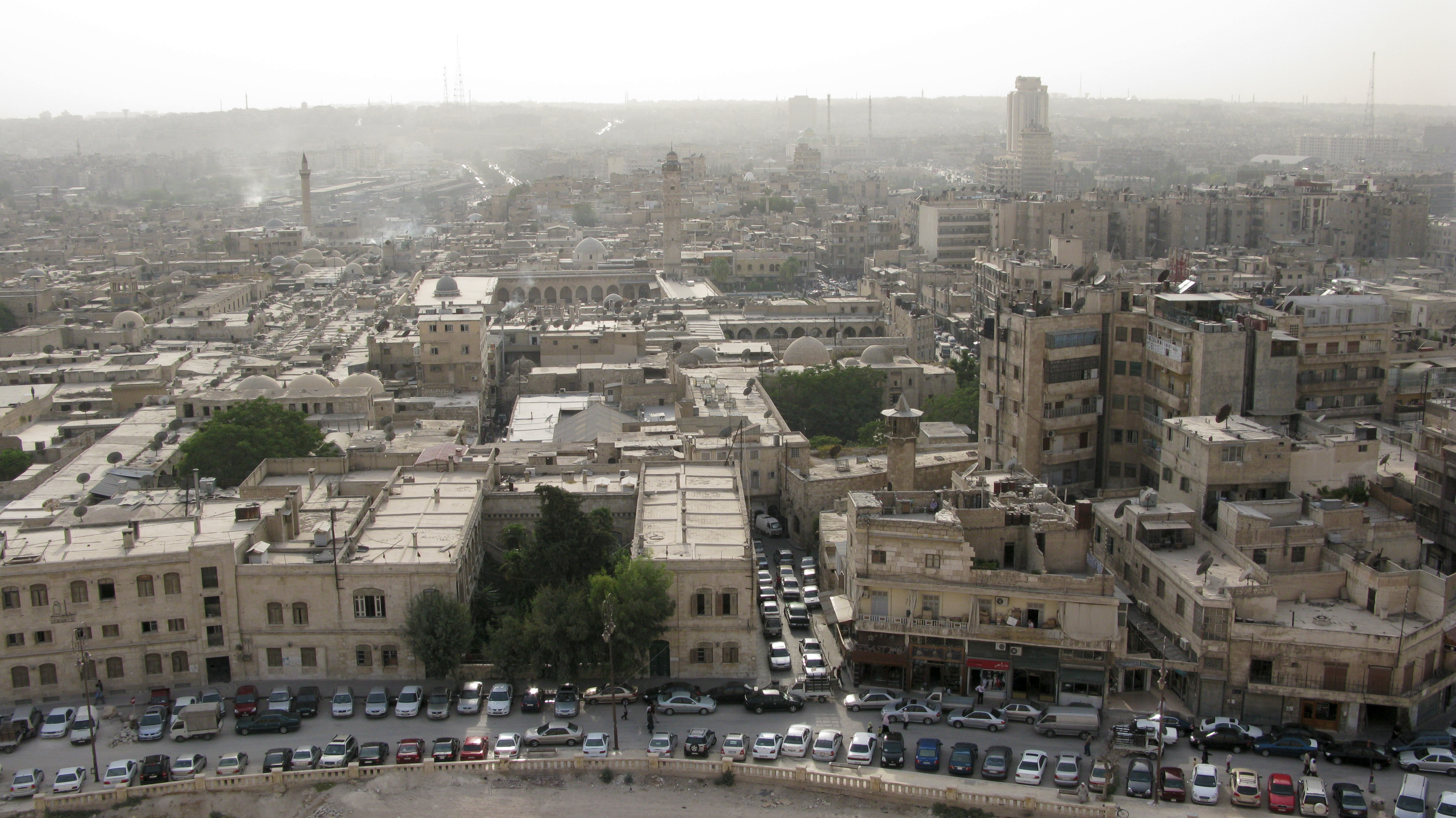
- Ancient Aleppo

UNESCO World Heritage Site
- Official name: Ancient City of Aleppo
- Location: Aleppo, Syria
- Includes: Citadel of Aleppo, Al-Madina Souq
- Criteria: Cultural: (iii), (iv)
- Reference: 21
- Inscription: 1986 (10th Session)
- Endangered: 2013–2020
- Area: 364 ha (1.41 sq mi)

The Behramiyah Mosque (Arabic: جَامِع الْبَهْرَمِيَّة, romanized: Jāmiʿ Bahramīyah) is a mosque in Aleppo, Syria. Completed during the Ottoman period, the mosque is located in al-Jalloum district to the west of the Citadel, between gate of Antioch and Khan al-Jumrok, within the historic walls of the Ancient City of Aleppo, a World Heritage Site.

== Overview ==
The mosque was built in 1583 CE under the patronage of the Ottoman wali of Aleppo Behram Pasha and during the rule of the Ottoman sultan Murad III. It has an Ottoman khanqah-style architecture with circular minaret and a large central dome.

Throughout its history, the mosque was frequently renovated. During the 17th century, the minaret fell down and was re-constructed in 1699. After the deadly earthquake of Aleppo in 1822, the dome was destroyed and renovated in later in 1860.

== Gallery ==
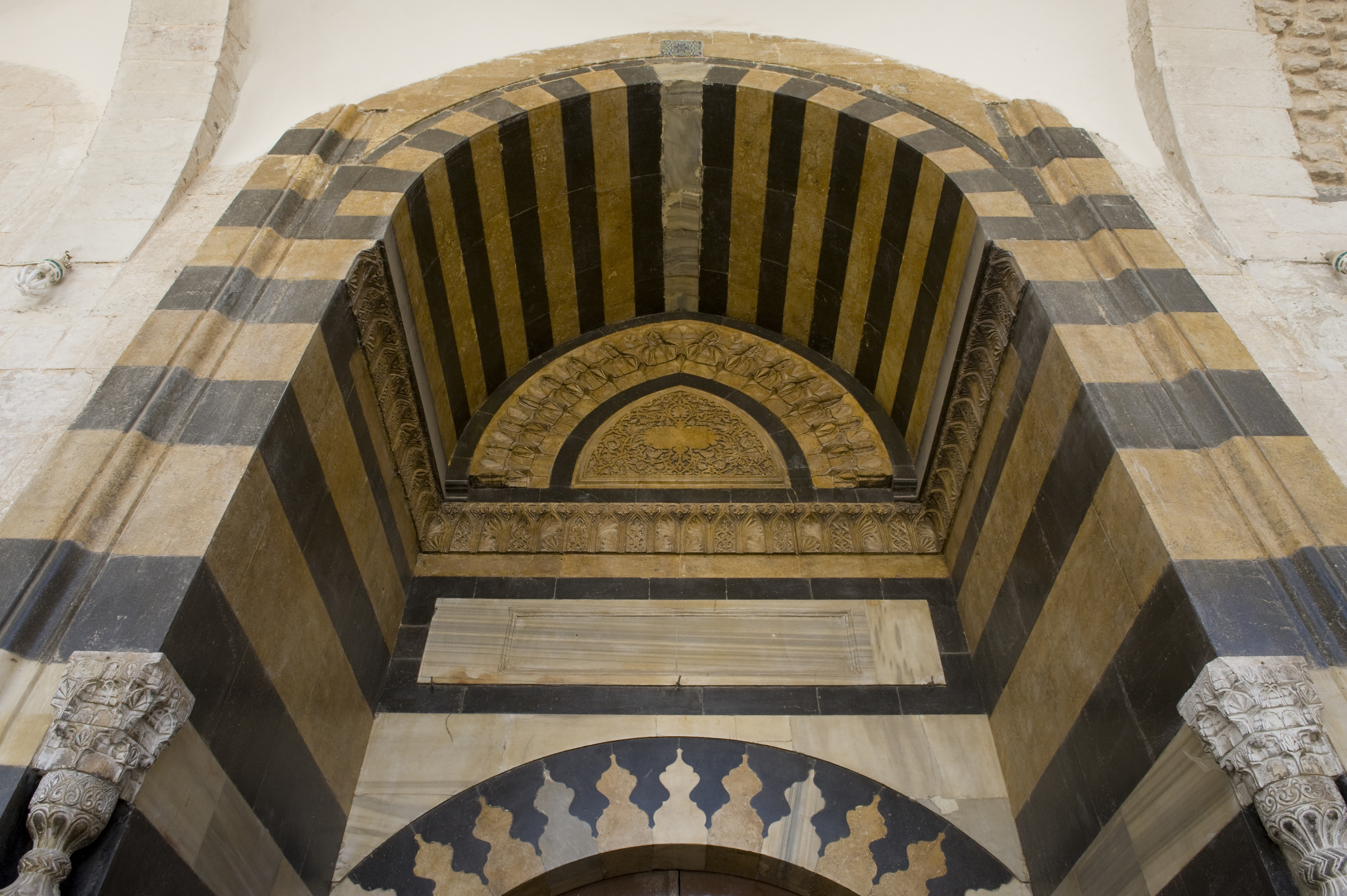
Above the entrance to the mosque

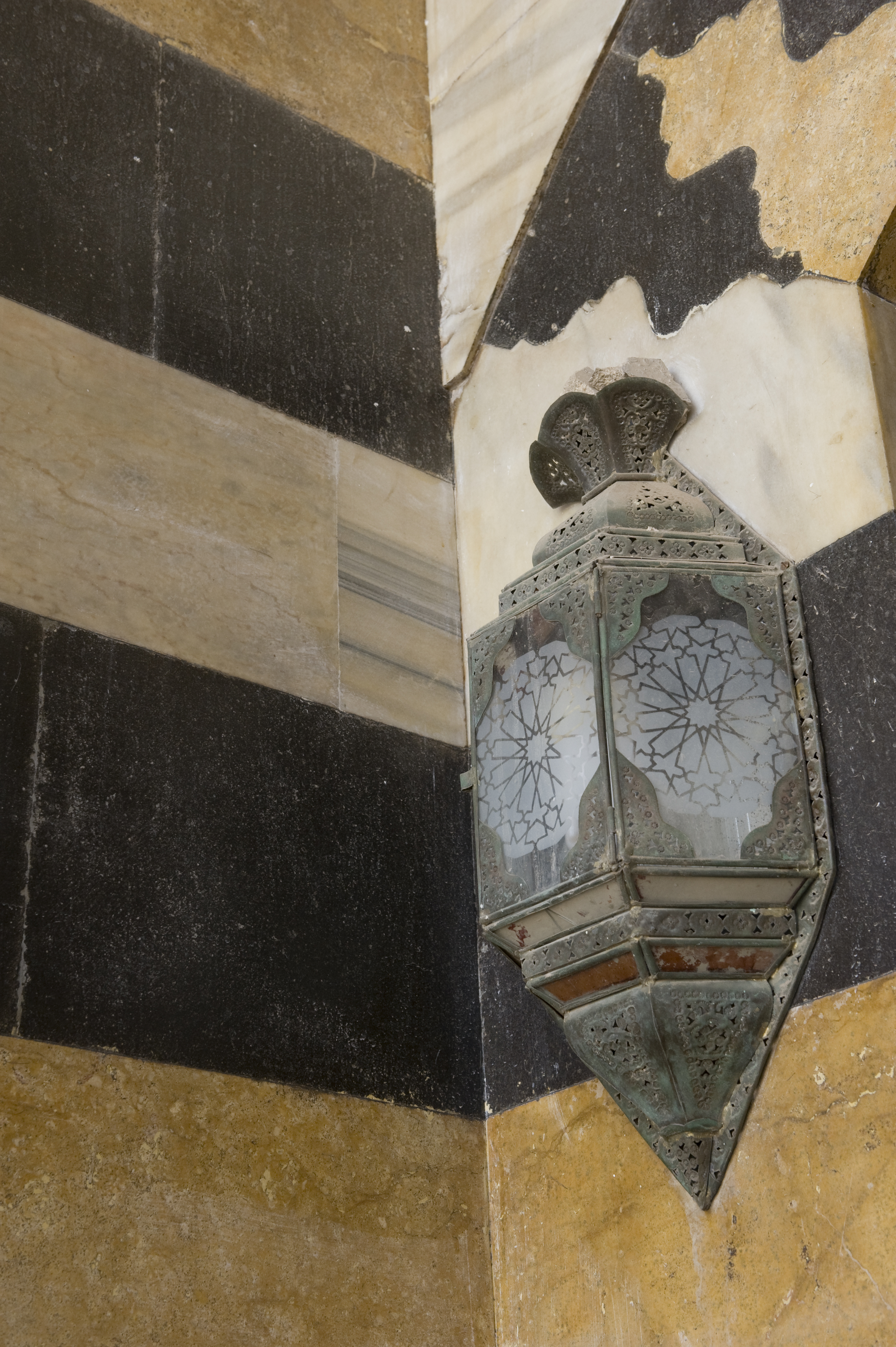
Side entrance

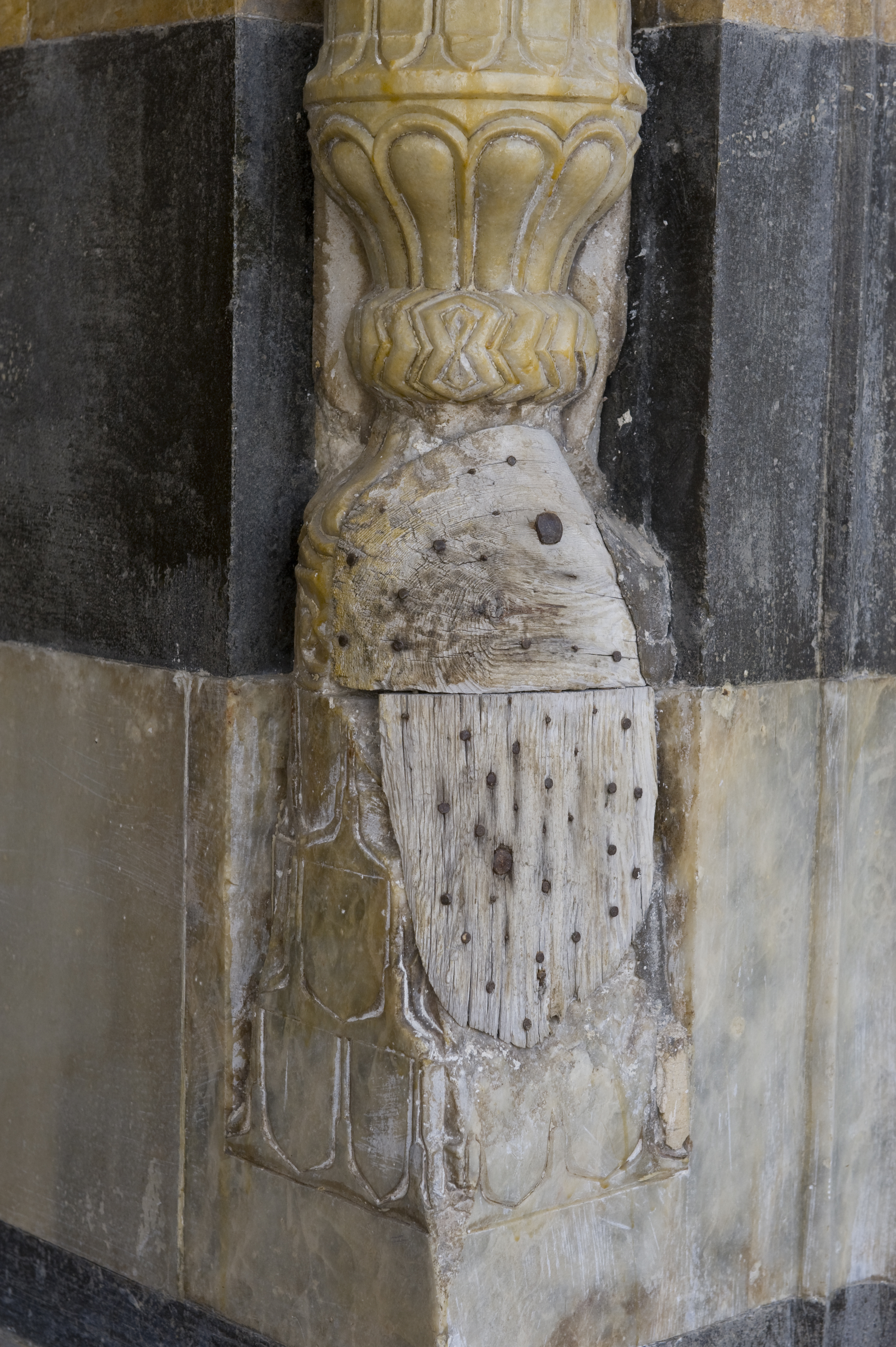
Decoration at entrance

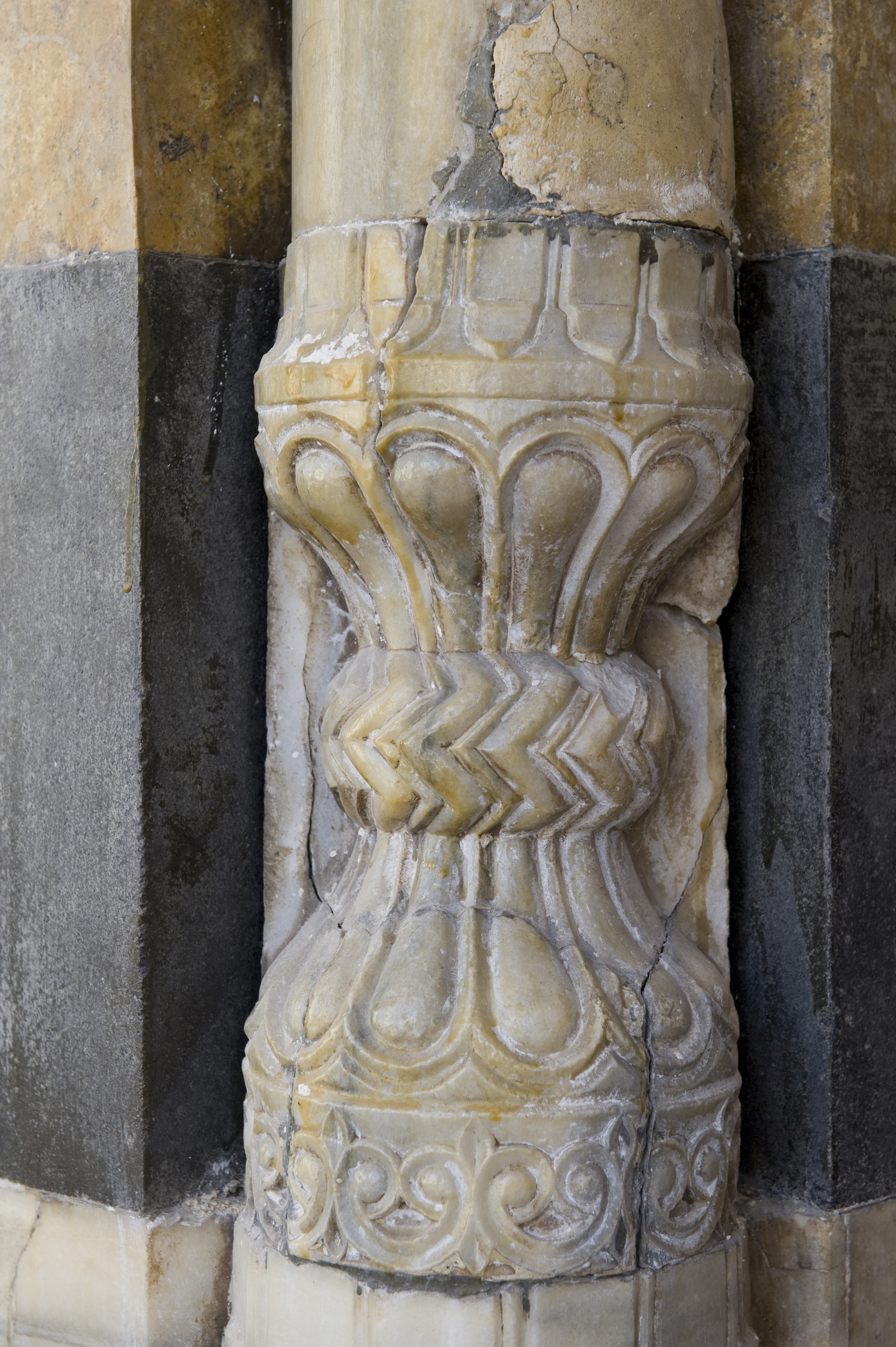
Decoration at entrance

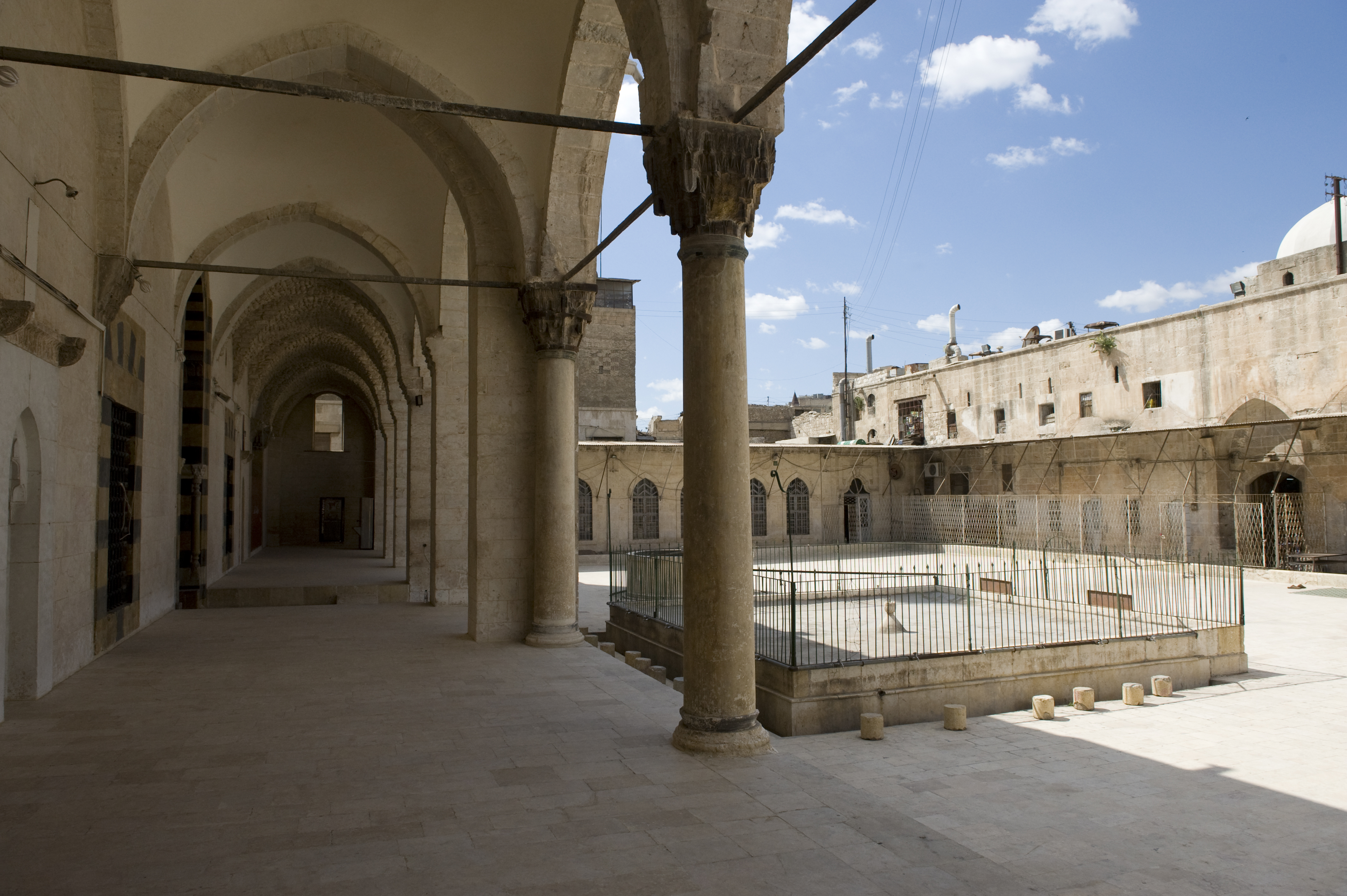
Portico and courtyard

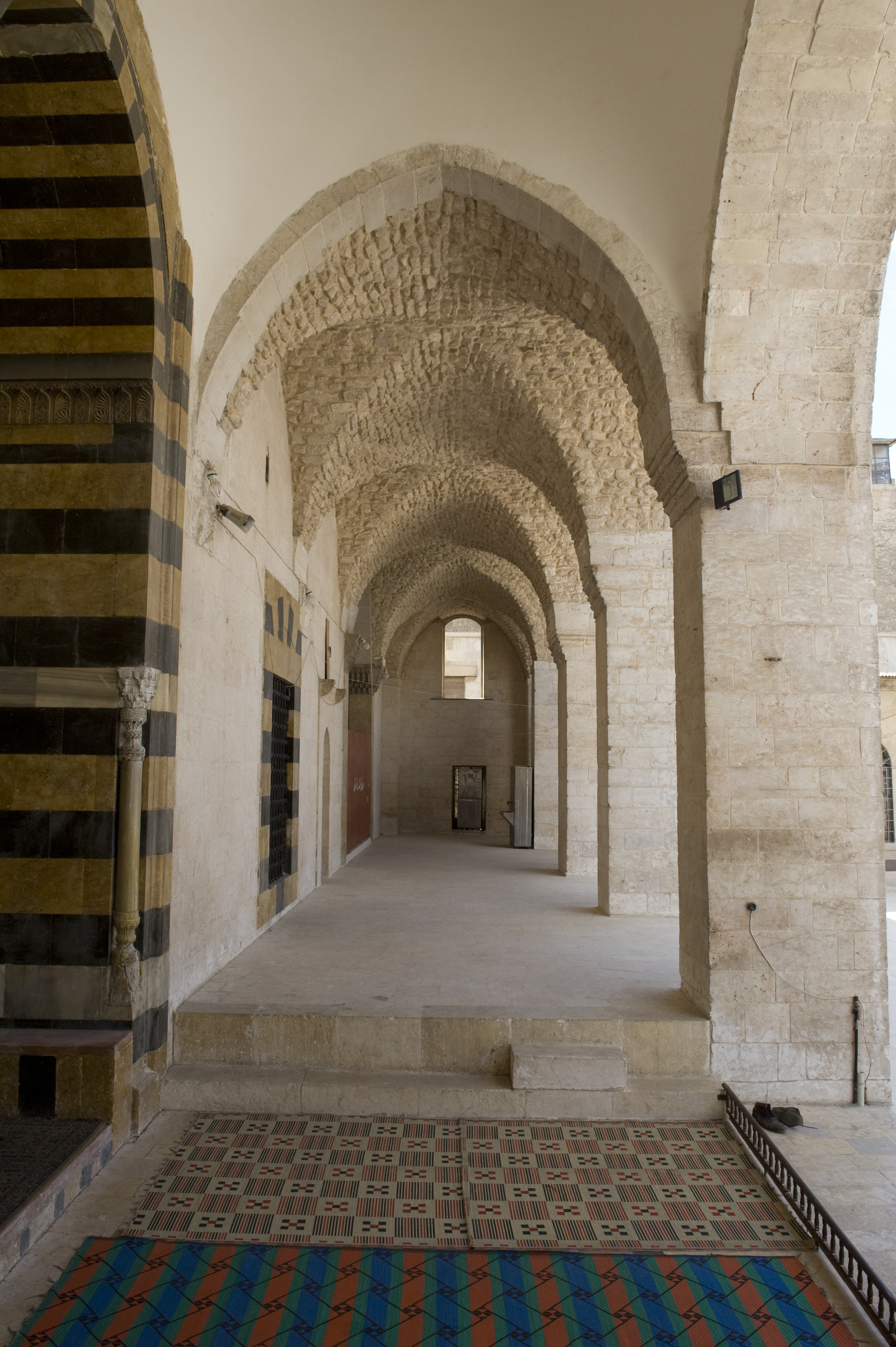
Portico

== See also ==
- Islam in Syria
- List of mosques in Aleppo
- List of mosques in Syria
