= Tawhid Mosque =

Mosque in Aleppo, Syria

- جَامِع التَّوْحِيد
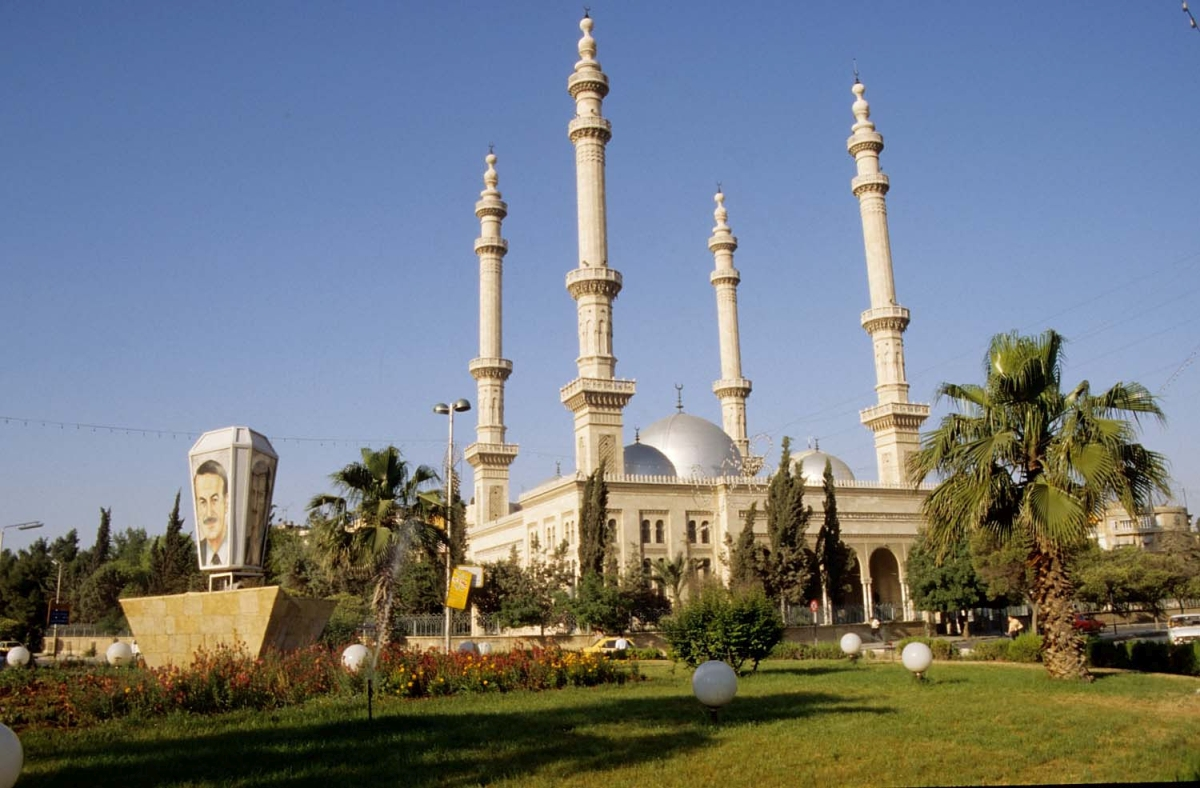
- The mosque in the late 1990s

- Location of the mosque in Aleppo

Religion
- Affiliation: Islam
- Ecclesiastical or organisational status: Mosque
- Status: Active

Location
- Location: Khalil al-Hindawi street, Aleppo
- Country: Syria
- Interactive map of Tawhid Mosque
- Coordinates: 36°12′52″N 37°09′12″E

Architecture
- Type: Islamic architecture
- Style: Early Abbasid; Modern
- Completed: 1981 CE

Specifications
- Dome: 5
- Minaret: 4

The Tawhid Mosque (Arabic: جَامِع التَّوْحِيد, romanized: Jāmiʿ at-Tawḥīd) is a mosque in Aleppo, Syria, located on Khalil al-Hindawi street, on the right bank of the Queiq River. It was opened in 1981 and features a combined style of the early Islamic Abbasid and modern mosque architecture.

It has a large central dome surrounded with four smaller domes and four circular minarets. It is surrounded by two churches: across the street to the north is the Chaldean Catholic Church of St Joseph, completed in 1974, and across the street to the east sits the large Greek Catholic Church of St George, completed in 1969. The mosque is notable for being built in a largely Christian-populated district of Aleppo.

== See also ==
- Islam in Syria
- List of mosques in Aleppo
- List of mosques in Syria
