= List of mosques in Aleppo =

Aleppo was never a capital of any of the grand Arab dynasties, but nevertheless the city's central position in the Levant between Damascus and Baghdad, and its closeness to Anatolia, helped the city to prosper fast. This is a list of mosques in Aleppo from different dynastic periods.

== Rashidunids ==
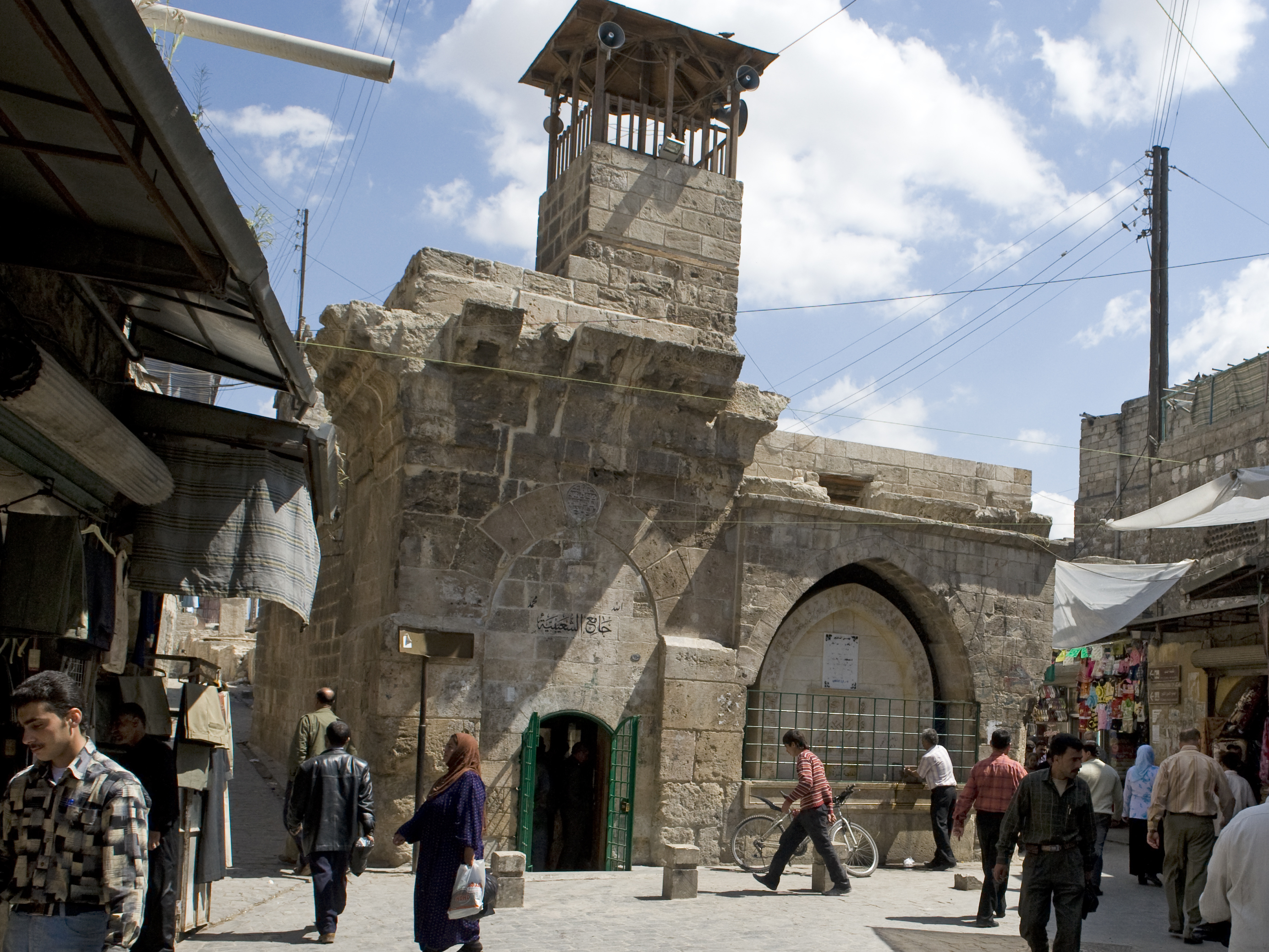
Al-Shuaibiyah Mosque, considered to be the oldest mosque in Aleppo

- Al-Shuaibiyah Mosque (al-Atras Mosque), 637 AD

== Umayyads ==
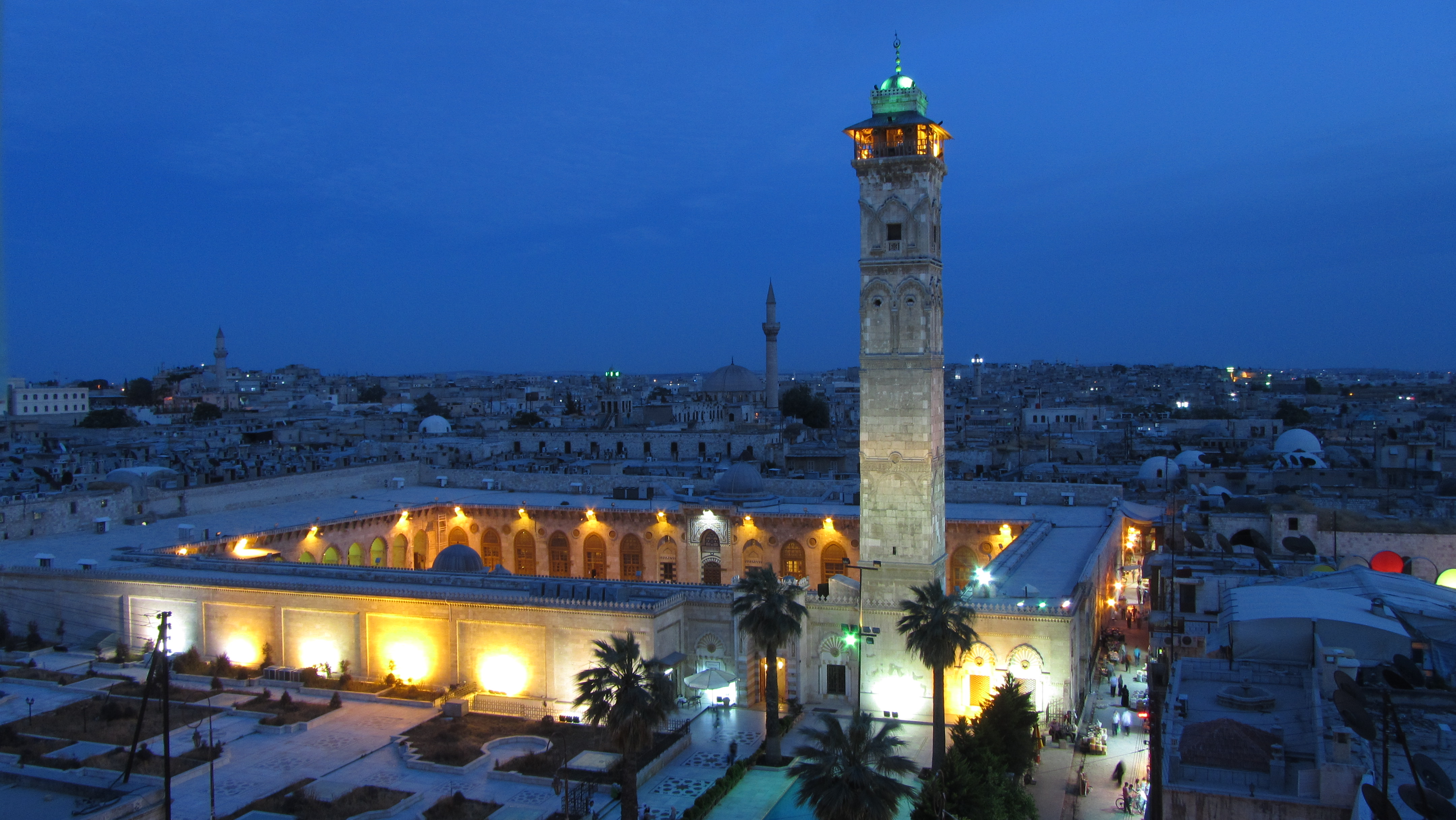
Great Mosque of Aleppo, the biggest monumental mosque in Aleppo

- Great Mosque of Aleppo, 716 AD

== Abbasids ==
=== Hamdanids ===
- Sheikh Mohsen mosque, Hammdanids, 962 AD
- Al-Nuqtah Mosque

=== Seljuks and Zengids ===
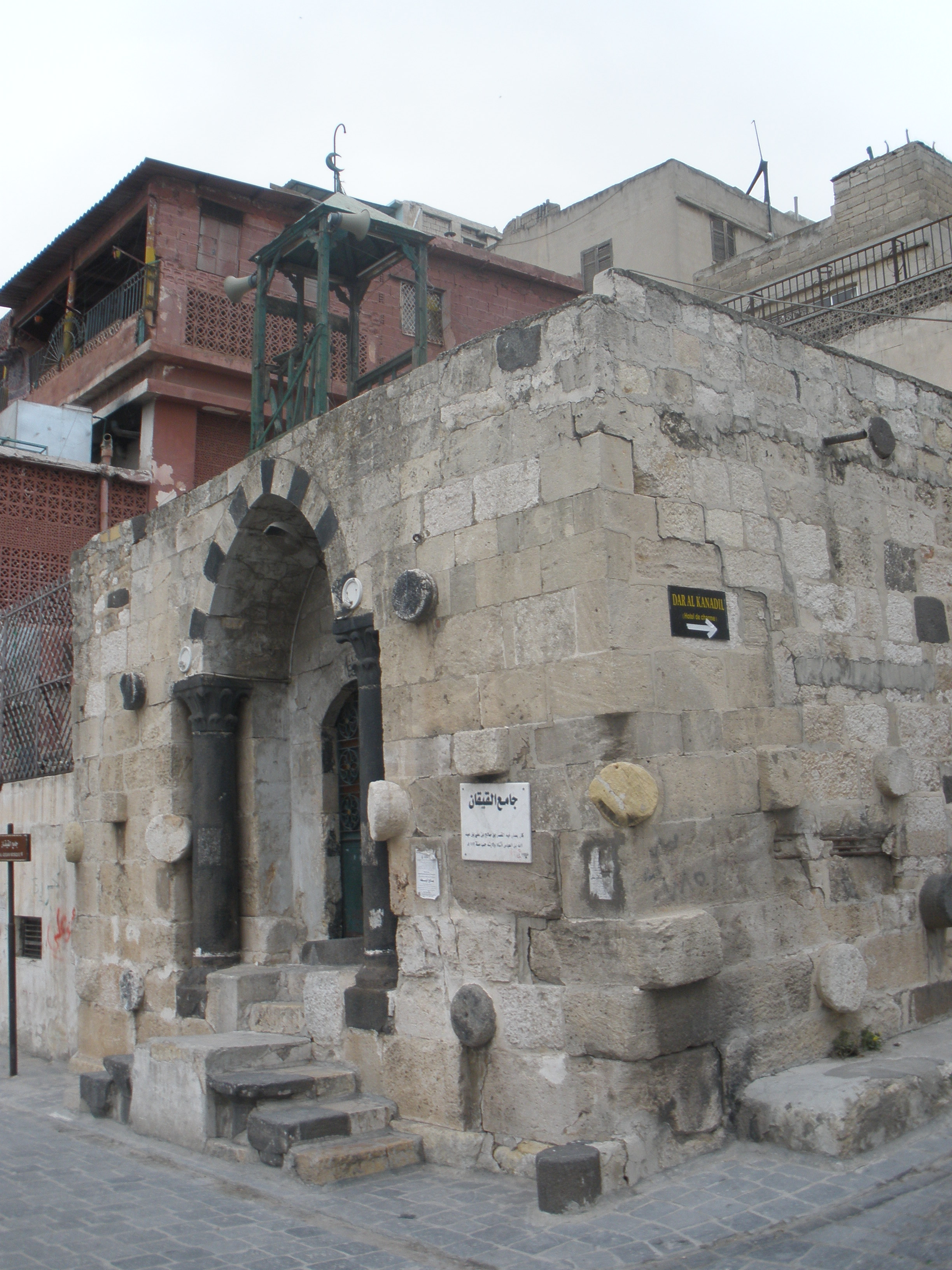
Al-Qaiqan Mosque

Al-Sultaniyah Mosque and Madrasa (destroyed in 2014)

- Al-Saleheen mosque, Seljuk, 1106 AD
- Arslan Dada mosque, Seljuk, 1115 AD
- Al-Seeda mosque, Zengid
- Al-Tersusi mosque, Zengid, 1146 AD
- Al-Muqaddamiyah Madrasa, Zengid, 1168 AD

=== Ayyubids ===
- Al-Qaiqan Mosque, 12th century
- Mosque of Al-Madrasah al Sharafeya, 1242 AD
- Khanqah Al-Farafira mosque (named after Farafira city in Egypt)
- Mosque of Sheikh Ma'rouf Bin Jamr, 1193 AD
- Mosque of Meeru (Shanqos mosque), 1220 AD
- Mosque of Al-Sheikh Hammoud, 1146 AD
- Al-Zaherya complex, 1219 AD
- Mosque of Sidna Hamza, 1156 AD
- Al-Zawya Al-Hilaleya mosque, 1213 AD
- Al-Atabkeya mosque, 1223 AD
- Mosque of Abu-Zer, 1198 AD
- Mosque of Al-Mustadameya (Ibn Al-Nafees mosque), 1223 AD
- Al-Sultaniyah Mosque and Madrasa, 1223 AD
- Al-Firdaws Mosque and Madrasa 1236 AD

=== Mamluks ===
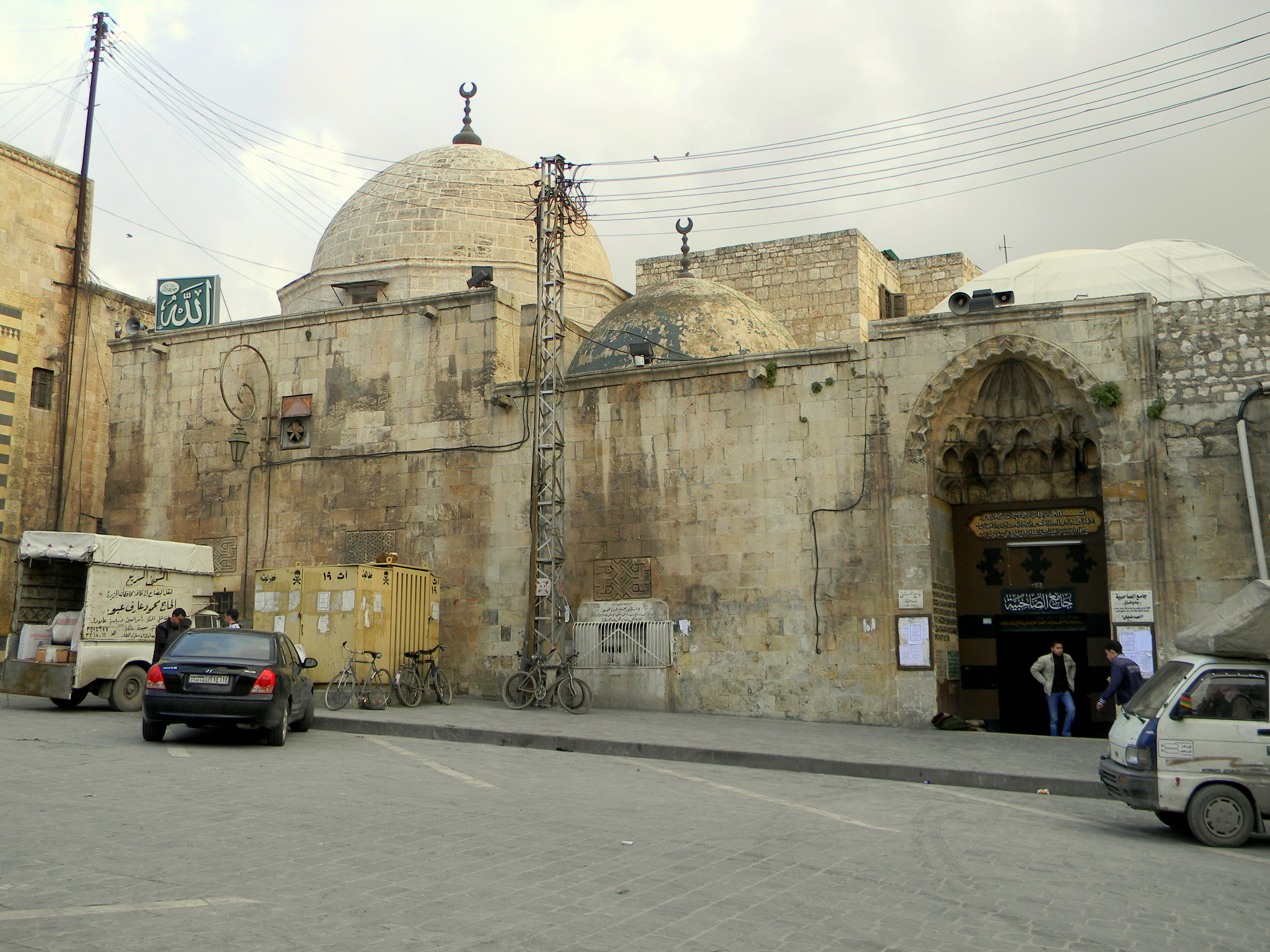
Al-Sahibiyah Mosque (Fustuq Mosque)

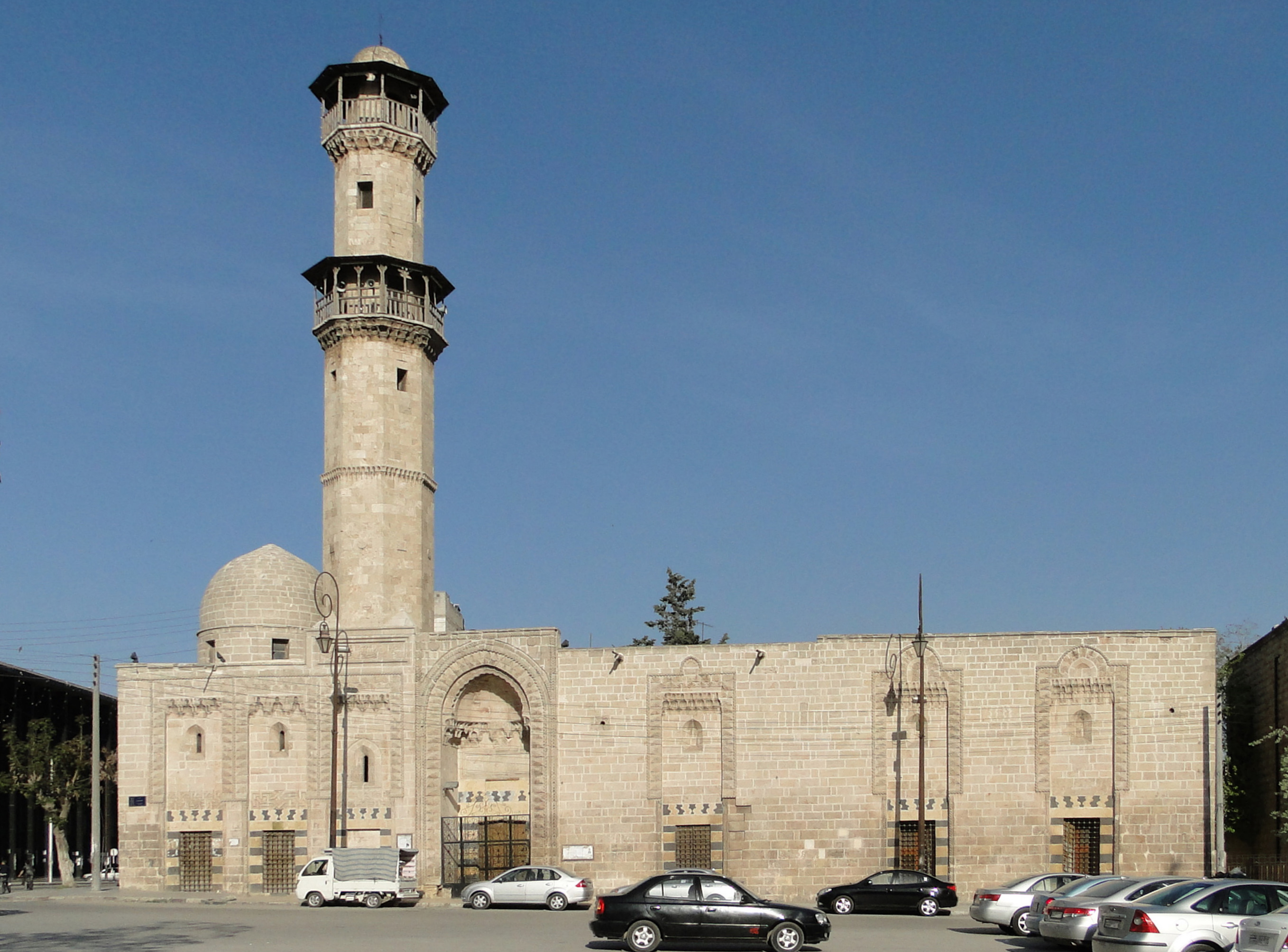
Al-Otrush Mosque

- Al-Sahibiyah Mosque (Fustuq Mosque), 1350 AD
- Al-Saffahiyah Mosque, 1425 AD
- Mosque of Sheikh Ali Al-Hindi
- Bawakib mosque 1885 AD
- Al-Ebn mosque 16th century
- Mosque of Qastel Harami, 1490 AD
- Al-Midani mosque, 16th Century
- Al-Mar'ashlee mosque, 1246 AD
- Nouredin mosque, 1327 AD
- Mosque of Al-Zaki, 1300 AD
- Sheikh Amr Al-Wafa'e Al-Ba'aj mosque, 1336 AD
- Al-Qarnaseya Complex
- Mahmandar Mosque, 1303 AD
- Mosque of Senekli, 1215 AD
- Al-Hariri mosque
- Complex of Al-Naseriya, 1323 AD
- Al-Bezazi mosque
- Al-Mawazeeni mosque, 1394 AD
- Al-Rumi mosque, 1366 AD
- Mosque of Ebis
- Mosque of Abu Yehya Al-Kawkabi
- Mosque of Suleyman Al-Ayyubi
- Mosque of Banuqsa, 1386 AD
- Altun Bogha Mosque, 1318 AD
- Terenta'eya Complex
- Bahsita Mosque, 1350 AD
- Al-Tawashi Mosque, 1348 AD
- Al-Otrush Mosque, 1408 AD
- Mosque of Seeta, 1471 AD
- Turkmanjek mosque, 1503 AD

== Ottomans ==
Al-Adiliyah Mosque (partially destroyed in 2014)

- Khusruwiyah Mosque, 1544 AD (completely destroyed in 2014)
- Al-Adiliyah Mosque, 1566 AD
- Behramiyah Mosque, 1583 AD
- Gheyour Bek mosque 1930 AD
- Zaki Pasha mosque 1898 AD
- Al-Malkhana mosque (Al-Mawlaweya Tikkeya)
- Al-Shaboura mosque (Kheir Allah mosque)
- Sa'ad Allah Al-Jabki mosque
- Al-Shara'asus Mosque
- Qastal Al-Mesht mosque, 1637 AD
- Al-Kilani mosque
- Al-'Aryan mosque, (Al-Sha'rani mosque), 1896 AD
- Al-Zawya Al-Aqiliya mosque, 1796 AD
- Konbor mosque, 1752 ad.
- Al-Fera mosque, (Al-Anjak mosque), 1622 AD
- Mosque of Al-Sharaf
- Haj Mousa mosque
- Souk Al-Zahawi mosque, 1803 AD
- Ma'lak Al-Sabou mosque, 1524 AD

== Modern ==
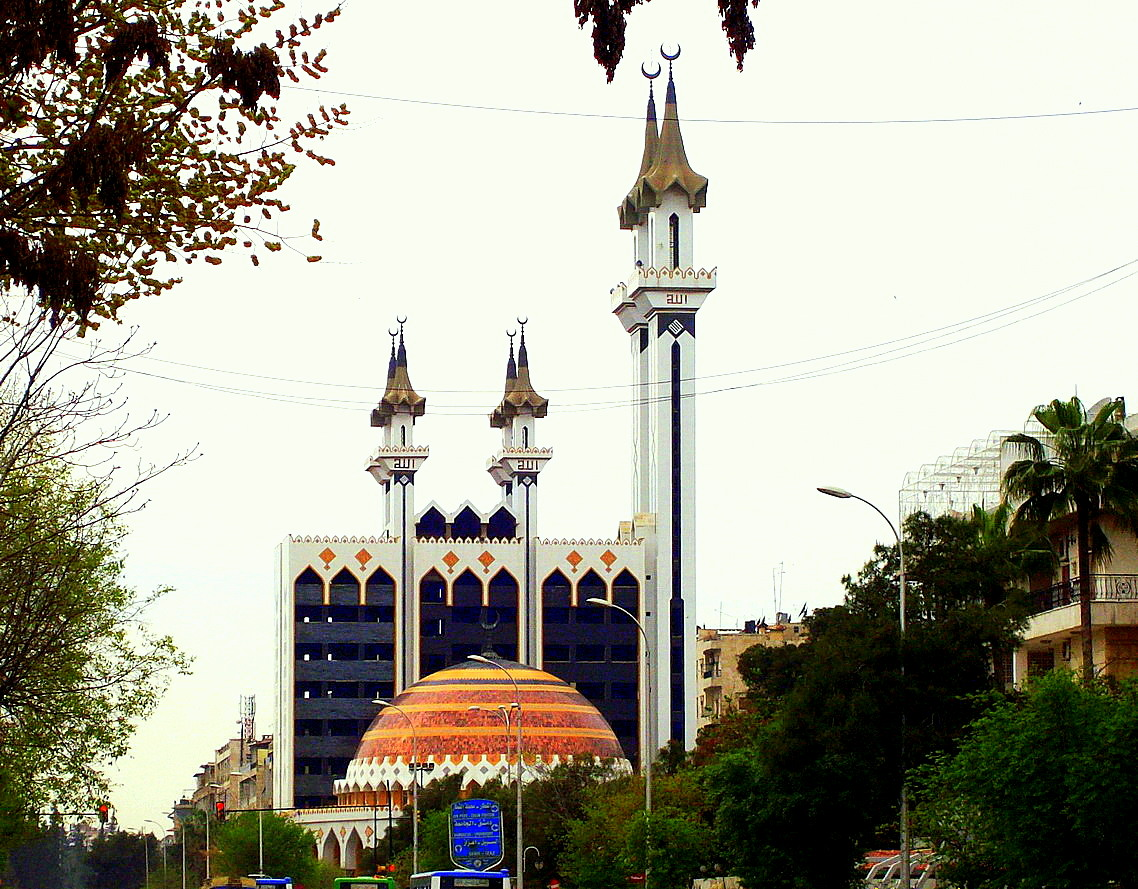
Al-Rahman Mosque

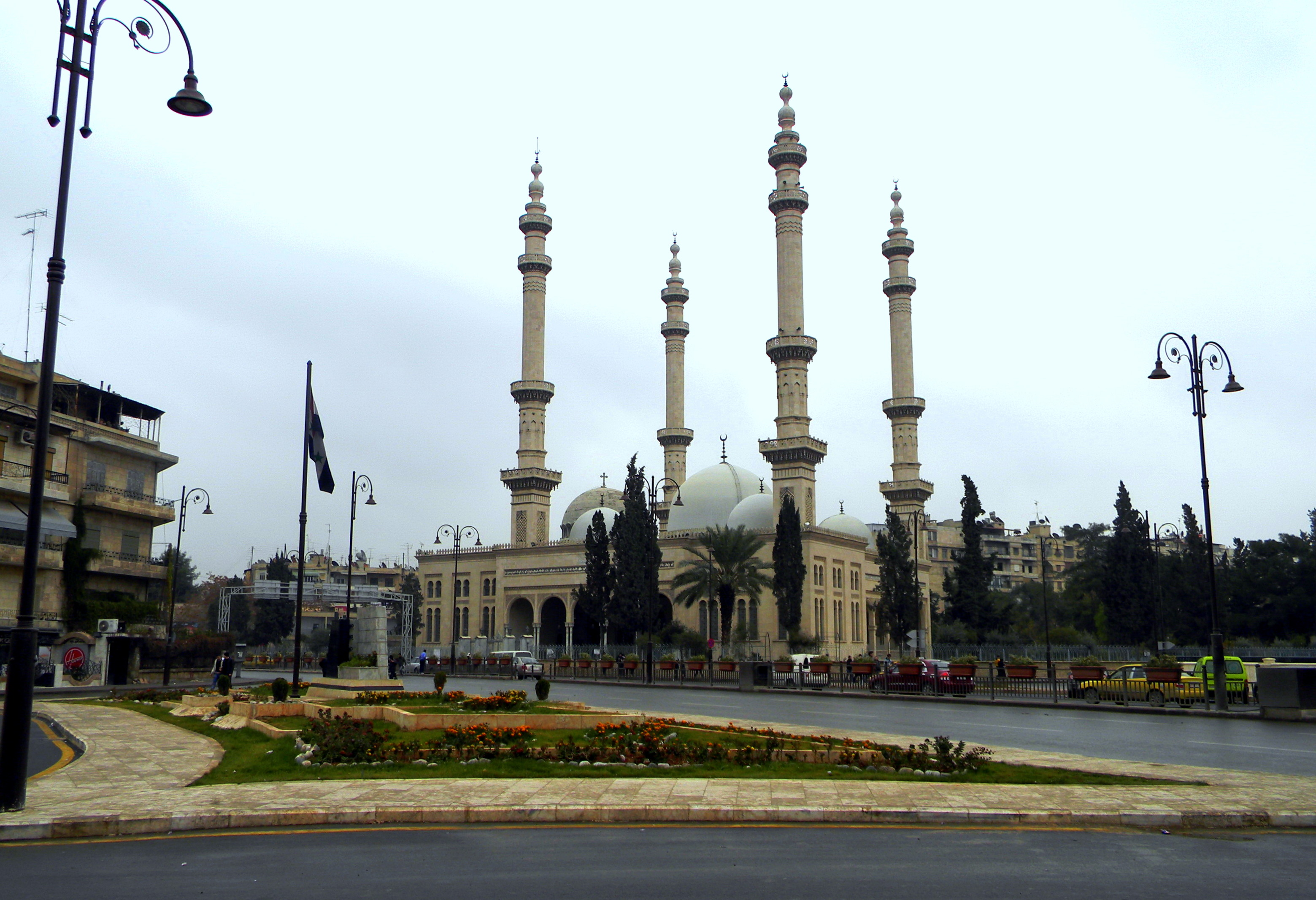
Al-Tawhid Mosque

- Al-Rahman mosque, 1976 AD
- Al-Tawhid Mosque
- Mosque of Ahmed Bin-Hanbal
- Amr Salem Mosque
- President's Mosque
- Al-Mazra'a mosque (Al-Shah'rour mosque)
- Al-Sadeek mosque, 1935
- Imam Shafe'i mosque
- Amr Bin Abdelaziz mosque
- Sa'ad Bin Abu Wuqas
- Azbakeya mosque
- Sheikh Taha mosque
- Dar Essalam mosque
- Mosque of El-Sheikh Maksoud
- Grand Mosque of Salah Al-Din Al-Ayoubi, 1990
- Sheikh Amr Anis mosque, 1972
- Estekama mosque, 1991
- Mosque of Ahmed Al-Badawi, 1963
- Al-Midan Mosque (Shabarek mosque), 1948
- Al-Teena mosque
- Amri mosque

== See also ==
- Islam in Syria
- List of mosques in Syria
- List of mosques in Damascus
