= Altun Bogha Mosque =

Mosque in Aleppo, Syria

- جَامِع أَلْتُونْبُوغَا
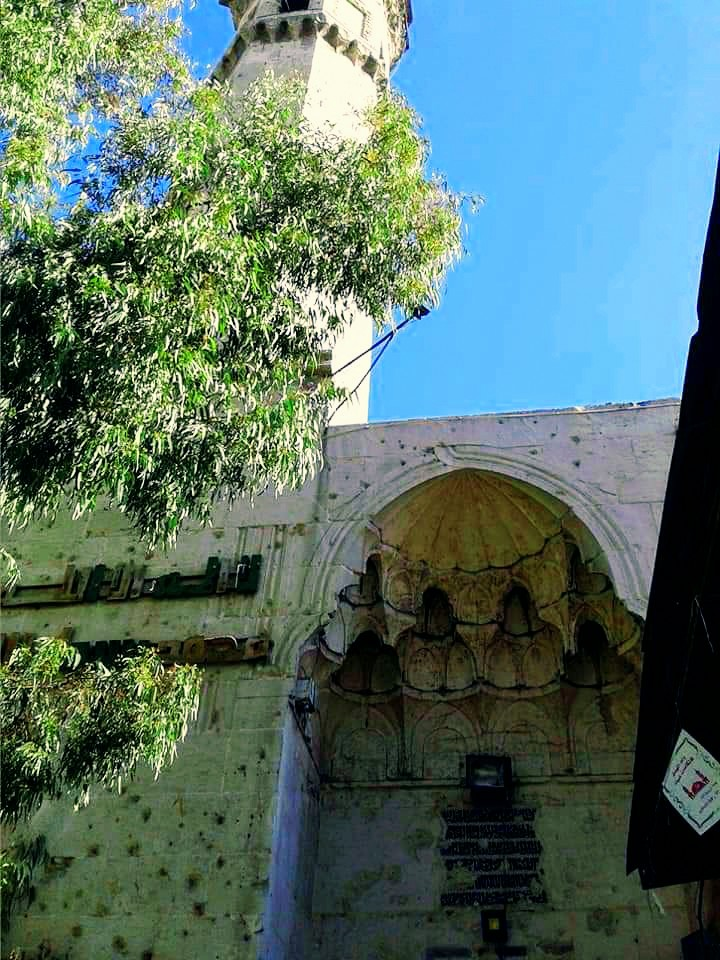
- The mosque in 2020

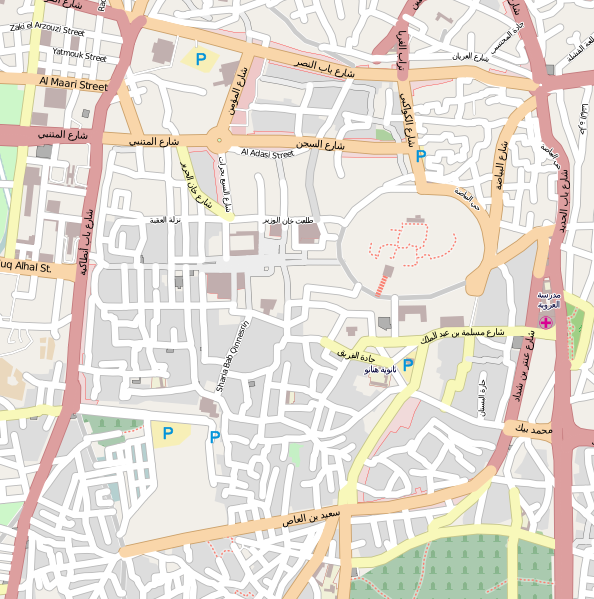
- Location of the mosque in the Ancient City of Aleppo

Religion
- Affiliation: Islam
- Ecclesiastical or organisational status: Mosque
- Status: Active

Location
- Location: Altunbogha district, Aleppo
- Country: Syria
- Interactive map of Altun Bogha Mosque
- Coordinates: 36°11′48″N 37°10′00″E

Architecture
- Type: Islamic architecture
- Style: Mamluk
- Founder: Alaaddin Altun Bogha al-Nasiri
- Completed: 1318 CE

Specifications
- Dome: 1
- Minaret: 1
- Materials: Stone

The Altun Bogha Mosque (Arabic: جَامِع أَلْتُونْبُوغَا, romanized: Jāmiʿ ʾAltūnbūḡā) is a mosque in Aleppo, Syria. It is located in the Ancient part of the city, east to the Citadel of Aleppo. It is also known as the Mosque of Sahat al-Milh (Arabic: جَامِع سَاحَة الْمِلْح, romanized: Jāmiʿ Sāḥat al-Milḥ, lit. 'Salt Square Mosque'), as it was built near a large salt warehouse.

== History ==
The mosque was built in 1318 CE by the Circassian ruler of Aleppo; emir Alaaddin Altun Bogha al-Nasiri, during the reign of the Mamluk sultan Al-Nasir Muhammad. It was built on the place of one of the earliest mosques in Aleppo, the mosque of al-Midan al-Aswad. The dome of the mosque is famous for its internal decoration characterized with the traditional Islamic muqarnas. The minaret in polygonal.

In the modern era, the mosque was partially renovated in 1921.

== See also ==
- Islam in Syria
- List of mosques in Aleppo
- List of mosques in Syria
