= Mahmandar Mosque =

Mosque in Aleppo, Syria

- جَامِع الْمَهْمَنْدَار
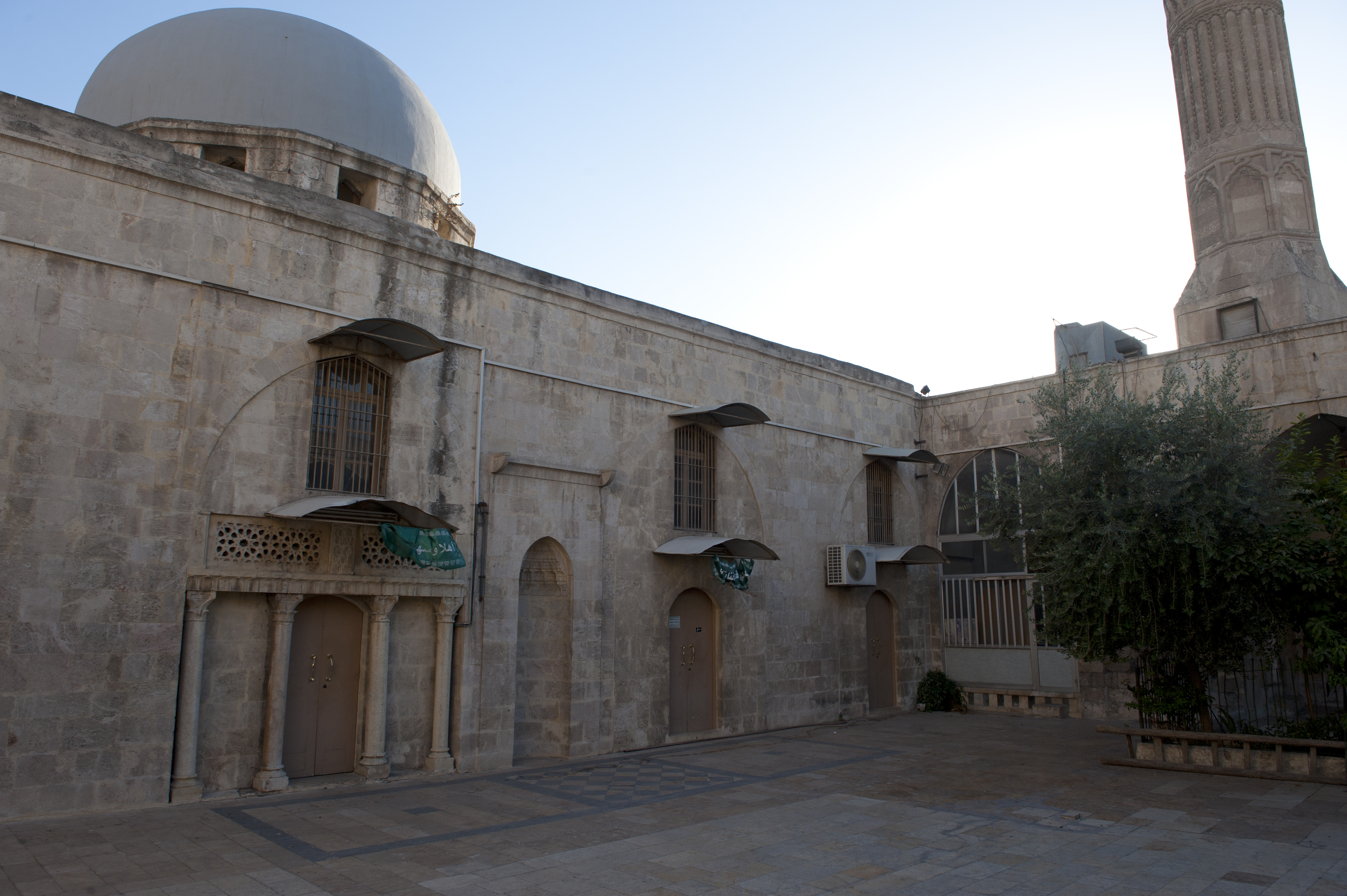
- The mosque in 2010

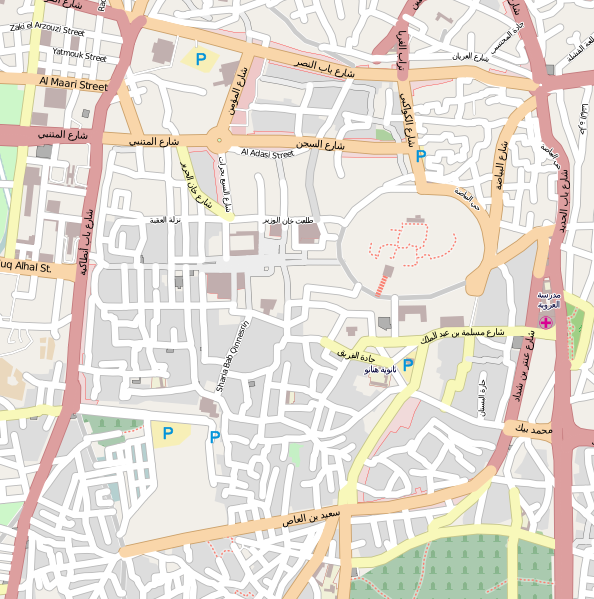
- Location of the mosque in the Ancient City of Aleppo

Religion
- Affiliation: Islam
- Ecclesiastical or organisational status: Mosque
- Status: Active

Location
- Location: Al-Farafira district, Aleppo
- Country: Syria
- Interactive map of Mahmandar Mosque
- Coordinates: 36°12′09″N 37°09′38″E

Architecture
- Type: Islamic architecture
- Style: Mamluk; Mongol
- Founder: al-Hasan bin Balaban
- Completed: 1303 CE

Specifications
- Minaret: 1 (damaged in 2012)
- Materials: Stone
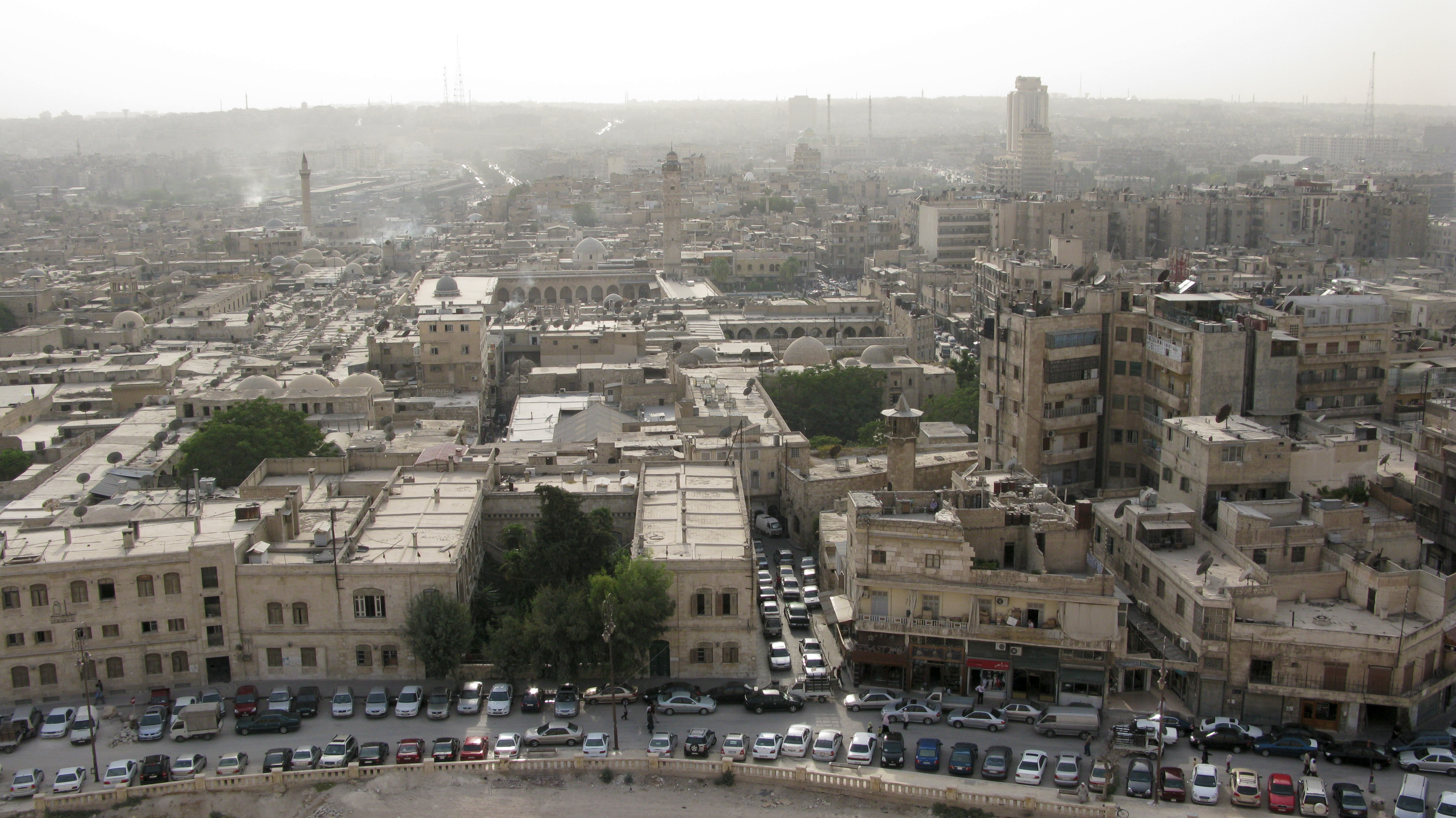
- Ancient Aleppo

UNESCO World Heritage Site
- Official name: Ancient City of Aleppo
- Location: Aleppo, Syria
- Includes: Citadel of Aleppo, Al-Madina Souq
- Criteria: Cultural: (iii), (iv)
- Reference: 21
- Inscription: 1986 (10th Session)
- Endangered: 2013–2020
- Area: 364 ha (1.41 sq mi)

The Mahmandar Mosque (Arabic: جَامِع الْمَهْمَنْدَار, romanized: Jāmiʿ al-Mahmandār) is a mosque in Aleppo, Syria. It is located in the Ancient part of the city, a World Heritage Site, north to the Citadel of Aleppo.

== History ==
The mosque was built in 1303 CE by al-Hasan bin Balaban (also known as the son of the Mahmandar), one of the high-ranked officers in the city of Aleppo. The word mahmandar itself is derived from the Persian words of mahman meaning the guset and dar meaning the officer. It was built in the Mamluk and later in Mongol style. The mosque was severely damaged during the 1822 earthquake.

The mosque was entirely reconstructed in 1946.

In 2012 it was reported that the mosque minaret was damaged earlier that year, during the Battle of Aleppo.

== See also ==
- Islam in Syria
- List of mosques in Aleppo
- List of mosques in Syria
