= Al-Sahibiyah Mosque =

Mosque in Aleppo, Syria

al-Sahibiyah Mosque
- جَامِع الصَّاحِبِيَّة
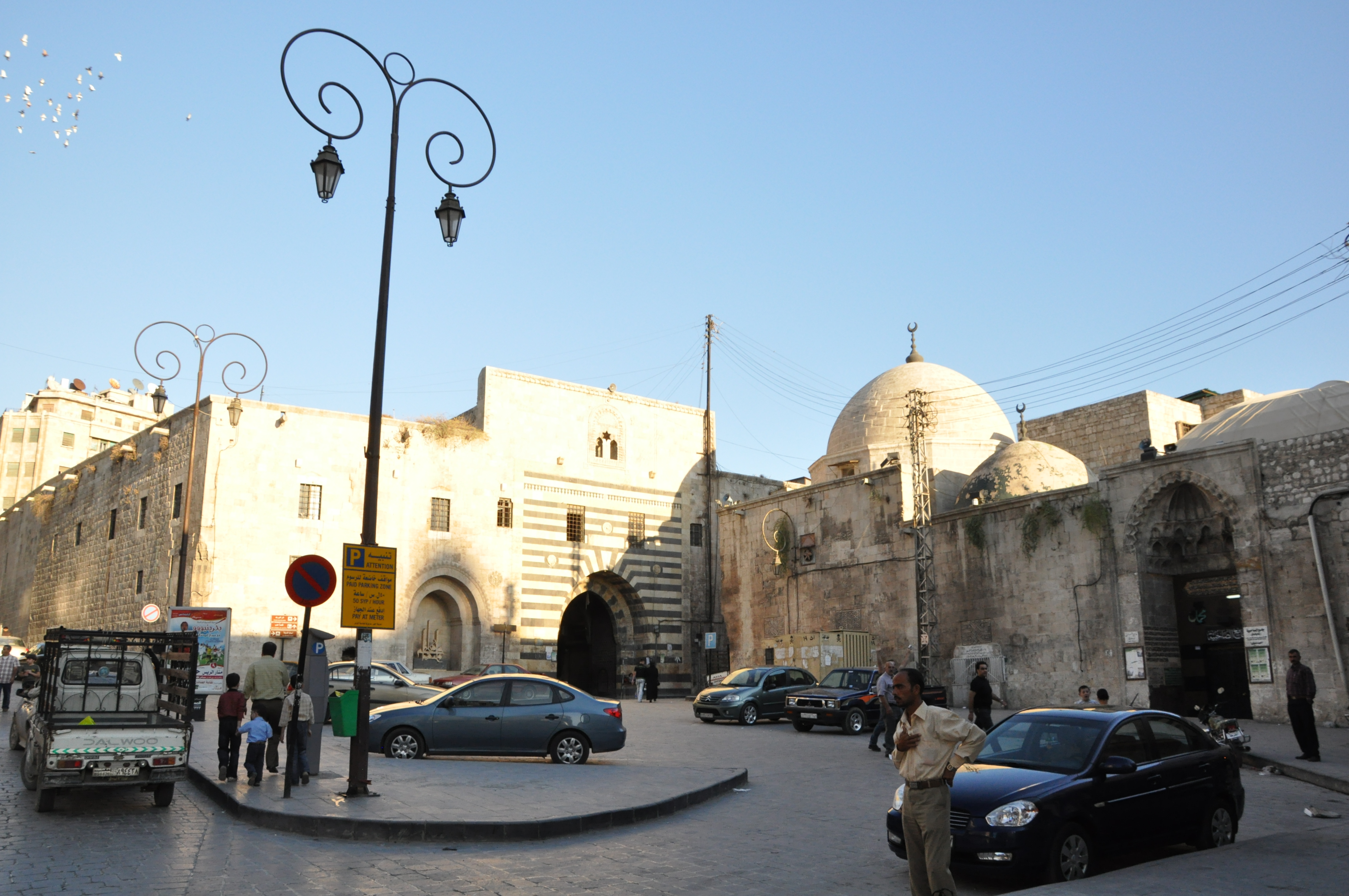
- The mosque in 2009

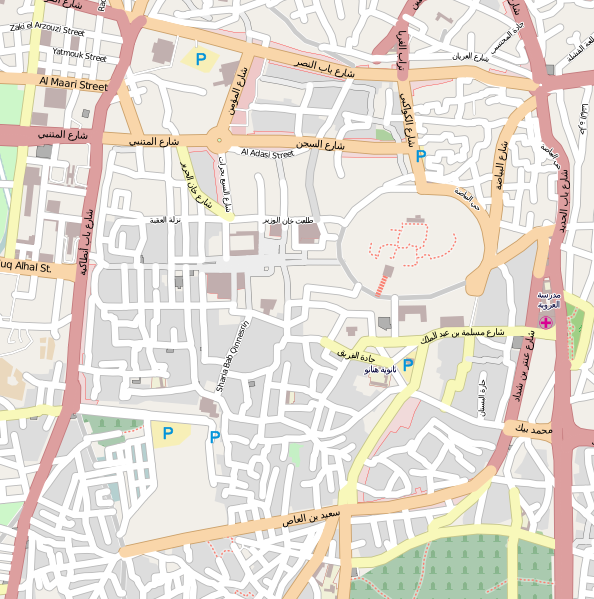
- Location of the mosque in the Ancient City of Aleppo

Religion
- Affiliation: Islam
- Ecclesiastical or organisational status: Mosque and madrasa
- Status: Active

Location
- Location: al-Jalloum district, Aleppo
- Country: Syria
- Interactive map of al-Sahibiyah Mosque
- Coordinates: 36°11′59″N 37°09′31″E

Architecture
- Type: Islamic architecture
- Style: Mamluk
- Founder: Ahmad bin Yaqoub al-Saheb
- Completed: 1350 CE

Specifications
- Dome: 2
- Materials: Stone
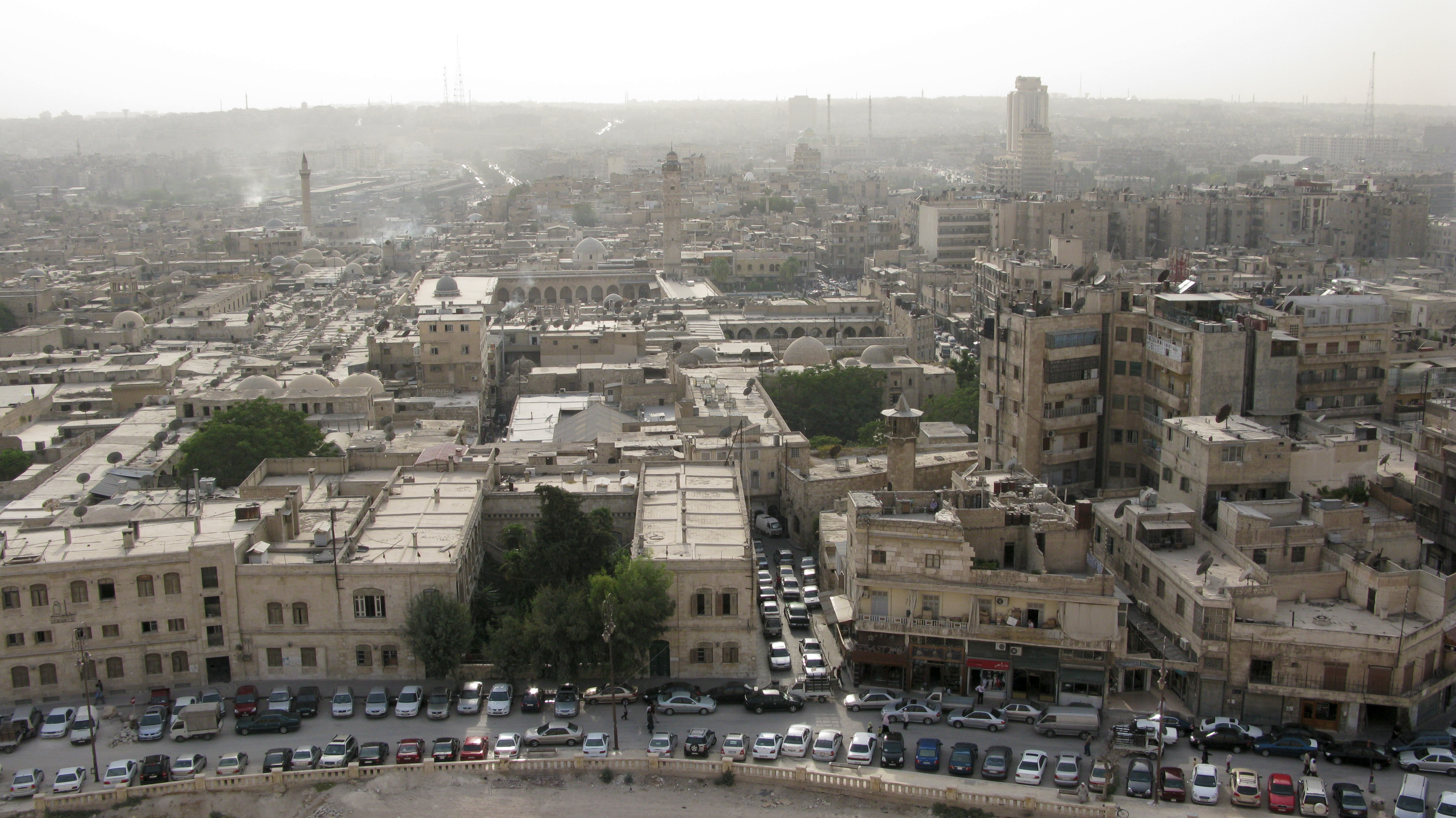
- Ancient Aleppo

UNESCO World Heritage Site
- Official name: Ancient City of Aleppo
- Location: Aleppo, Syria
- Includes: Citadel of Aleppo, Al-Madina Souq
- Criteria: Cultural: (iii), (iv)
- Reference: 21
- Inscription: 1986 (10th Session)
- Endangered: 2013–2020
- Area: 364 ha (1.41 sq mi)

The Al-Sahibiyah Mosque (Arabic: جَامِع الصَّاحِبِيَّة, romanized: Jāmiʿ aṣ-Ṣāhibīyah), also known as the Fustoq Mosque (Arabic: جَامِع فُسْتُق, romanized: Jāmiʿ Fustaq, lit. 'Pistachio Mosque' or Arabic: جَامِع فُسْتَق, romanized: Jāmiʿ Fustuq), is a 14th-century mosque and madrasa in Aleppo, Syria. It is located in the heart of the Ancient City of Aleppo, a World Heritage Site, within the historic walls of the city, near the Khan al-Wazir, in front of Al-Matbakh al-Ajami palace.

== Overview ==
The mosque was built in 1350 CE by Ahmad bin Yaqoub al-Saheb, a high-ranked officer of the Mamluk sultanate in the city of Aleppo. The madrasa, known as Al-Saheb madrasa, was completed in 765 AH (1363/1364 CE). The main entrance is located on the north side of the mosque and characterized with the traditional Islamic muqarnas. Many old inscriptions can be seen on the western wall of the mosque.

== Gallery ==
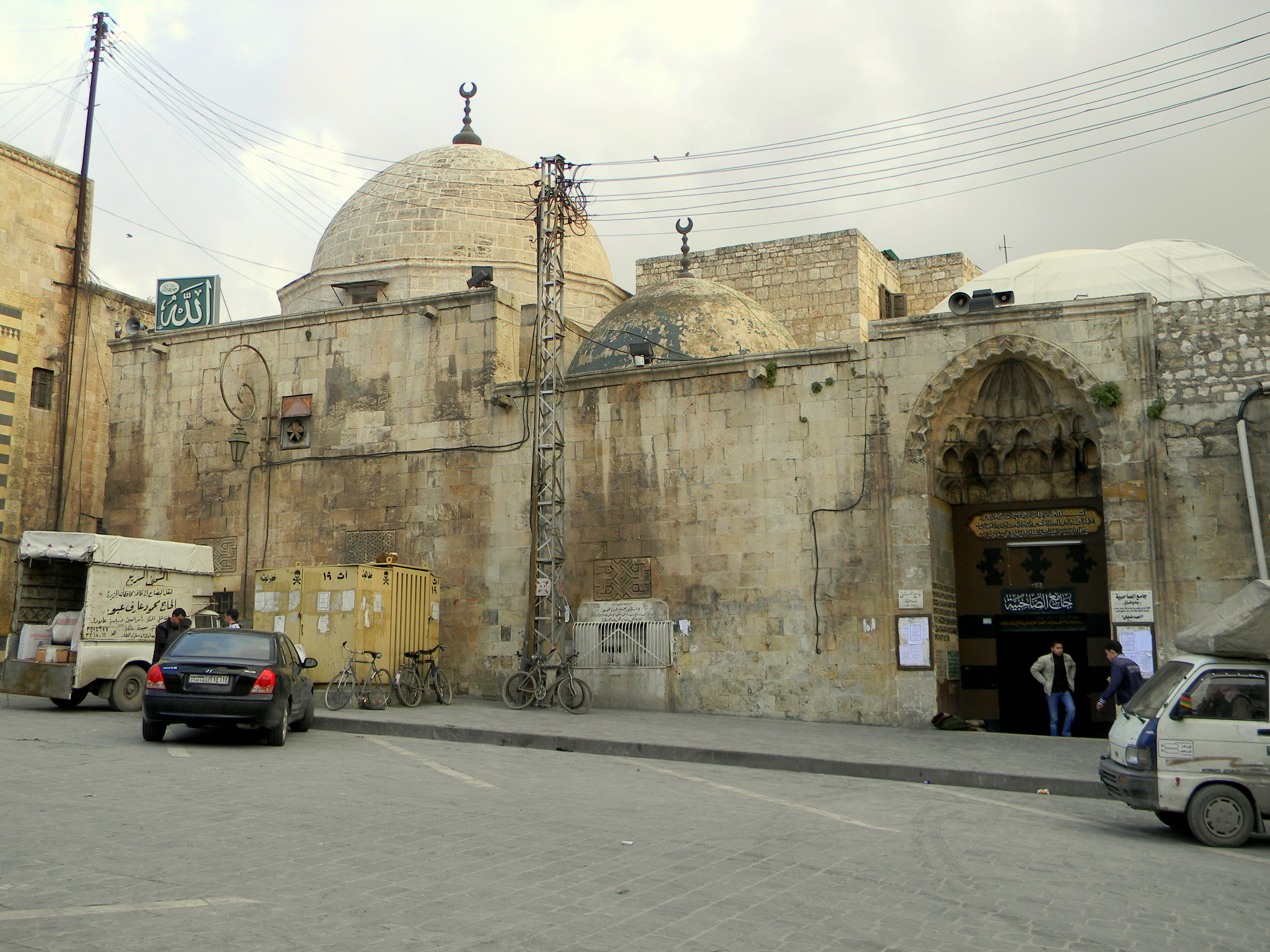
The main entrance

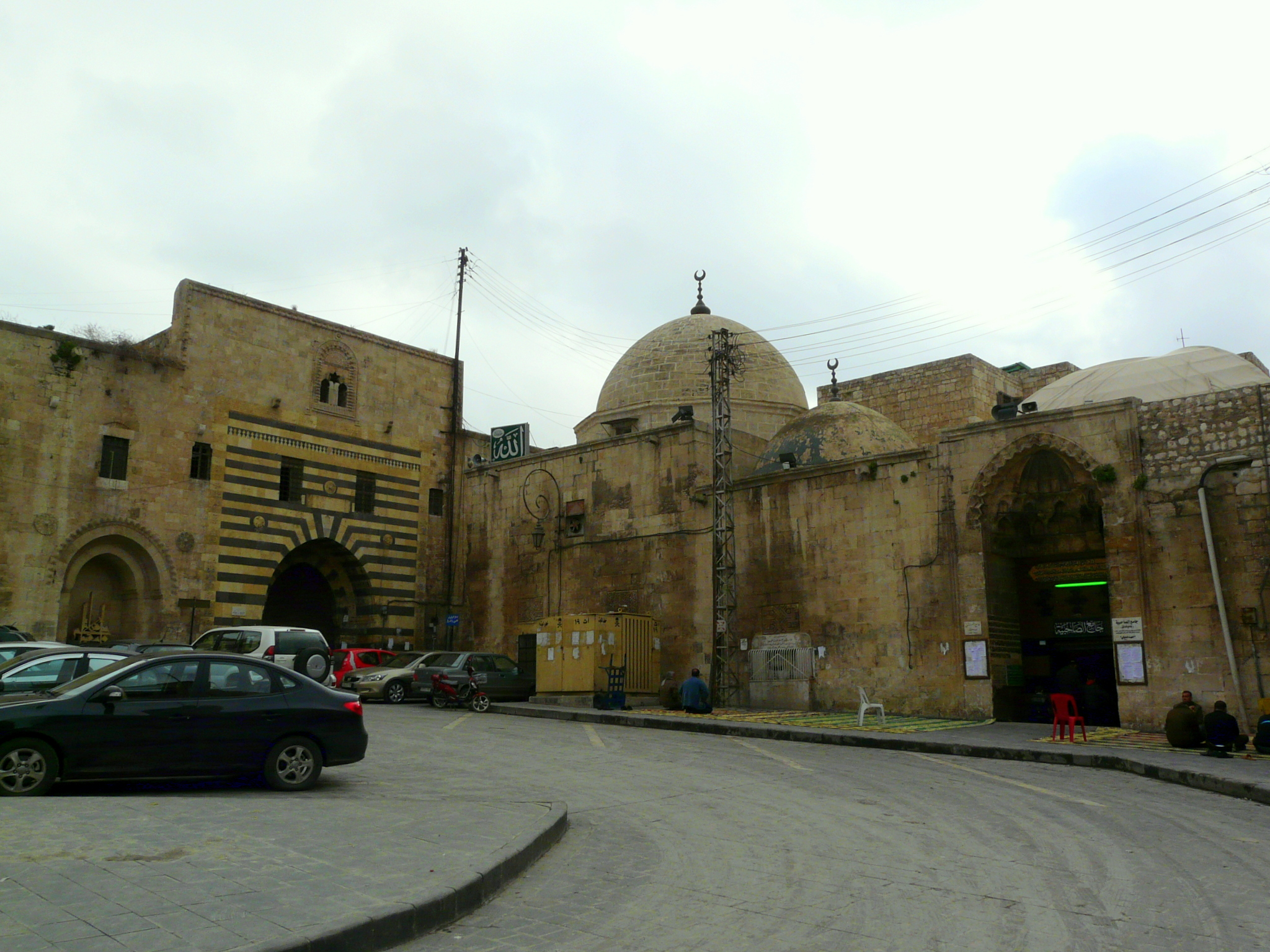
During Friday prayer

Portal of the Mosque

== See also ==
- Islam in Syria
- List of mosques in Aleppo
- List of mosques in Syria
