= Al-Tawashi Mosque =

Mosque in Aleppo, Syria

al-Tawashi Mosque
- جَامِع الطَّوَاشِيّ
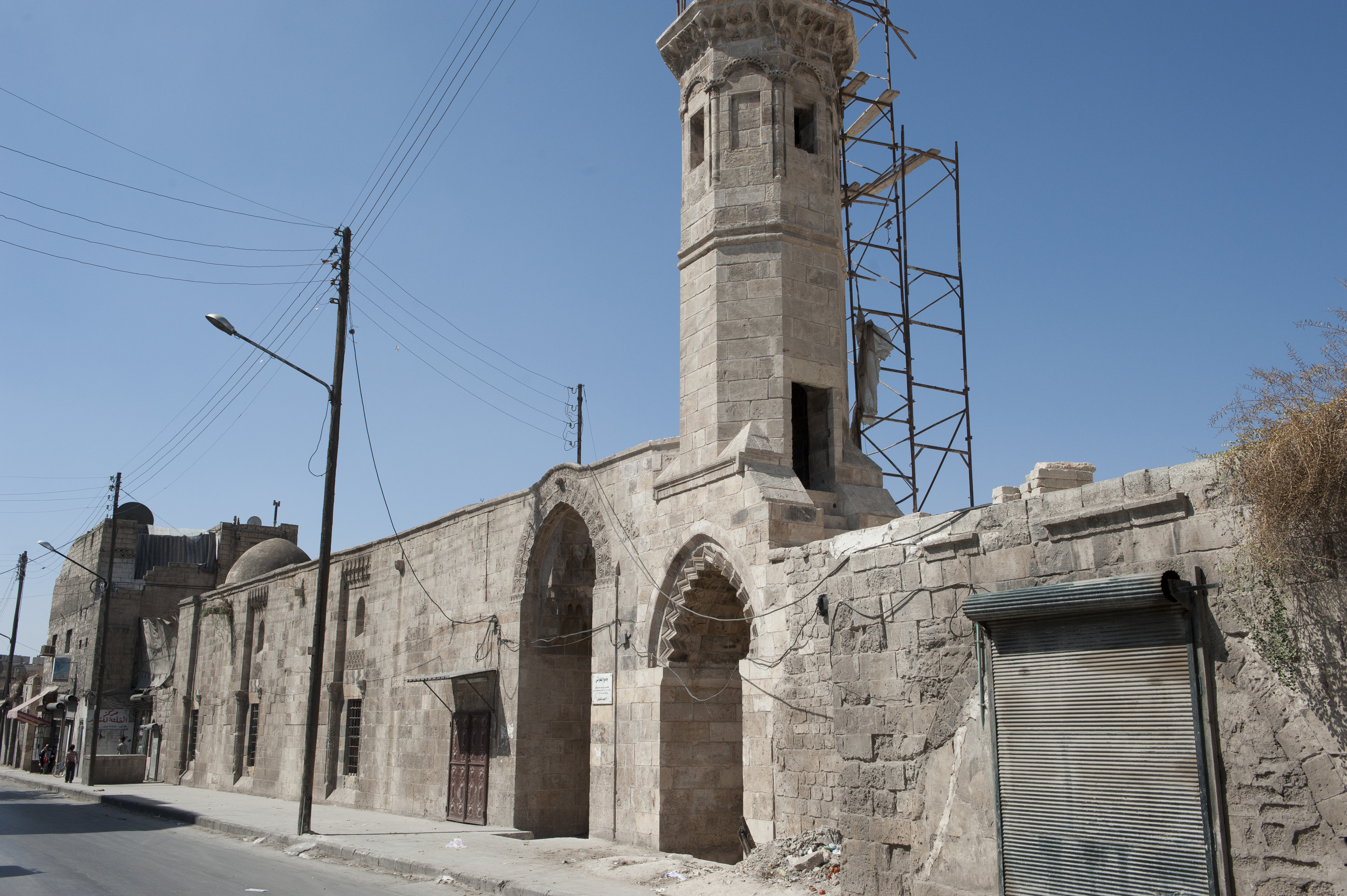
- The mosque and its minaret in 2010

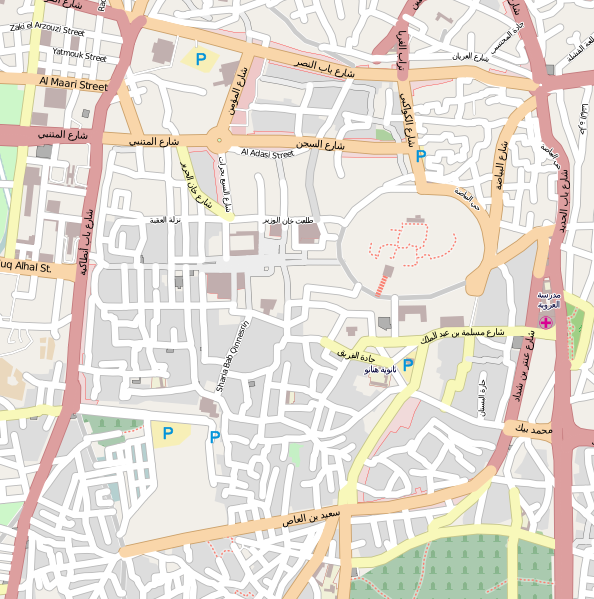
- Location of the mosque in the Ancient City of Aleppo

Religion
- Affiliation: Islam
- Ecclesiastical or organisational status: Mosque
- Status: Active

Location
- Location: al-Qasileh district, Aleppo
- Country: Syria
- Interactive map of al-Tawashi Mosque
- Coordinates: 36°11′41″N 37°09′43″E

Architecture
- Type: Islamic architecture
- Style: Mamluk
- Founder: Safi ad-Dine Jawhar al-Allani al-Tawashi
- Completed: 1348 CE

Specifications
- Dome: 1
- Minaret: 1
- Materials: Stone
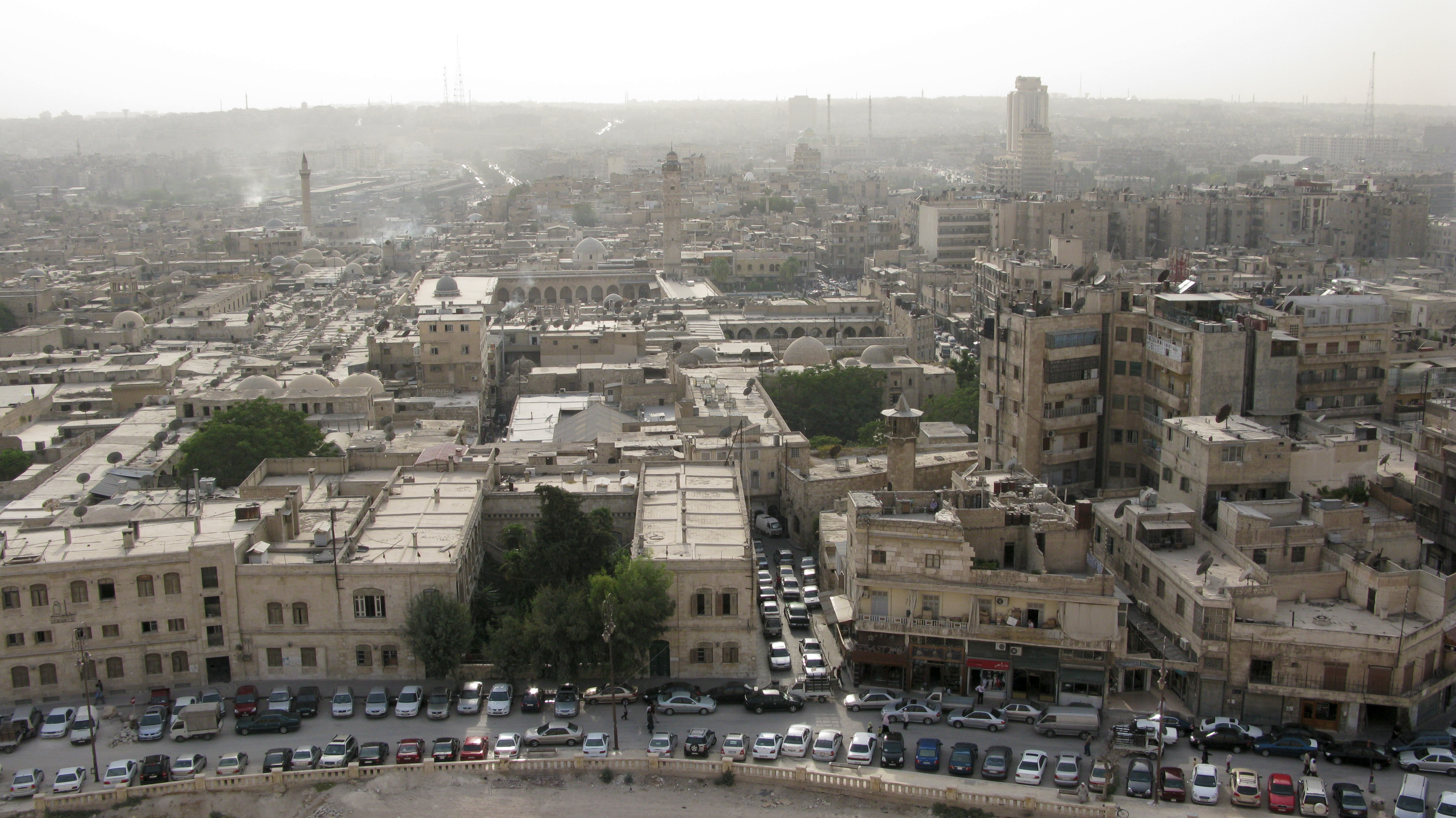
- Ancient Aleppo

UNESCO World Heritage Site
- Official name: Ancient City of Aleppo
- Location: Aleppo, Syria
- Includes: Citadel of Aleppo, Al-Madina Souq
- Criteria: Cultural: (iii), (iv)
- Reference: 21
- Inscription: 1986 (10th Session)
- Endangered: 2013–2020
- Area: 364 ha (1.41 sq mi)

The Al-Tawashi Mosque (Arabic: جَامِع الطَّوَاشِيّ, romanized: Jāmiʿ aṭ-Ṭawāšī), is a mosque in Aleppo, Syria, dating from the Mamluk period. It is located in al-Qasileh district of the Ancient City of Aleppo, a World Heritage Site, near the Bab al-Nairab.

== Overview ==
It was built in 1348 CE (Note: Also believed to be completed in 1372 CE.) by Safi ad-Dine Jawhar al-Allani al-Tawashi. It was renovated and enlarged in 1537 by Saadallah bin Ali bin Osman al-Malati.

The mosque is characterized with its short minaret, the decorated columns, and its main gate topped with traditional oriental muqarnas.

== See also ==
- Islam in Syria
- List of mosques in Aleppo
- List of mosques in Syria
