= Khalil al-Hindawi =

Syrian writer

Khalil Al Hindawi خليل الهنداوي
- Born: 1906; Sidon, Ottoman Empire
- Died: 1976 (aged 69–70); Aleppo, Syria
- Occupations: Poet, writer and educator
- Years active: 1924–1976
- Employer(s): Arab Cultural Center, Arab Writers Union Aleppo
- Notable work: Studied Texts
- Awards: The Honor Medal of Syrian Merit, First Class

Khalil Al Hindawi (1906, Sidon – 1976, Aleppo) was a Syrian writer and poet.

== Early life ==
Hindawi finished his studies at Al Makasid Islamic and Charitable Association in Saïda in 1924, and started teaching there when he was 17 years old. He was exiled from Lebanon by French authorities after delivering a poem in a national ceremony, welcoming Riad as-Solh, who was coming back from his exile for the first time in 1928. He was sent to Syria, and he stayed in Damascus during the First World War.

== Career ==
In 1929, he worked as a teacher at Deir ez-Zor high school in Syria, and started writing in Al Risala and Al Muktataf magazines. In 1939, he moved to Aleppo at the request of Saadallah al-Jabiri (later to become Prime Minister of Syria in 1943). He taught in Aleppo high schools until his retirement in 1966.

Hindawi is considered by the Syrian Ministry of Education to be the first teacher who knew the value of the text and was interested in analyzing it and offering insights into the form of a literature review. He did that in the 1930s, when people were only repeating the translation of the writers at that time, and totally depending on literary historians' provisions.

He was appointed Director of the Arab Cultural Center of Aleppo in 1958.

He held the presidency of the Arab Writers Union in Aleppo until his death in 1976.

A ceremony in the honor of Khalil Al hindawi was organized by the Arab Writers Union and the faculty of Arts at Aleppo University in March 1974. The occasion was to mark half a century of his literary work.

He has been granted the Honor Medal of Syrian Merit, First Class.

== Works ==
- Abū al-ʻAlāʼ al-Maʻarrī, 973–1057. Tajdīd Risālat al-ghufrān [taʼlīf] 1965
- Yawm al-Yarmūk 1974
- Mukhtārāt min al-aʻmāl al-kāmilah / Khalīl al-Hindāwī; iʻdād ʻUmar al-Daqqāq, Walīd Ikhlāṣī. 1980
- Min ajwāʼ al-Sharq : Hārūt wa-Mārūt 2008
- Tajdīd Risālat al-ghufrān. 1965
- Ḥāfiẓ Ibrāhīm, shāʻir al-Nīl.
- Damʻat Ṣalāḥ al-Dīn. 1958
- Yawm Dāḥis wa-al-Ghabrāʼ. 1974
- Ayyām al-ʻArab. 1974
- Ayyām al-ʻIrāq. 1974
- Maa̕ al-imām ʻAlī. 1962
- Yawm al-Basūs. 1974
- Yawm al-Qādisīyah. 1974
- Muntakhab min al-Aghānī. 1967
- Taysīr al-inshāʼ.
