= Bab Antakeya =

Coordinates: 36°11′55.25″N 37°9′5.25″E

Bab Antakeya Bāb Antakiya
- بَاب أَنْطَاكِيَّة
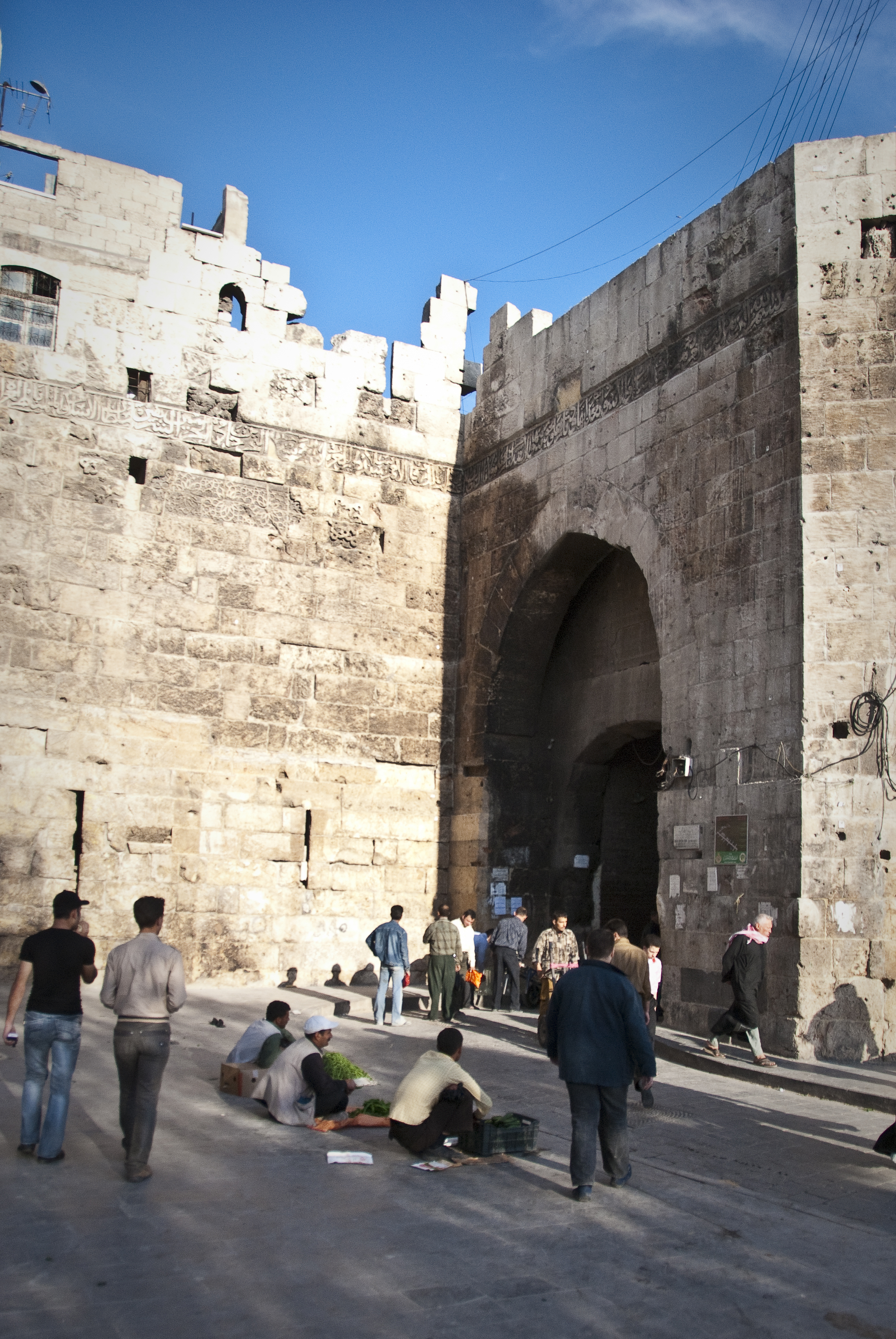
- Interactive map of the Bab Antakeya; Bāb Antakiya area

General information
- Status: restored
- Type: City gate
- Architectural style: Byzantine architecture Islamic architecture
- Location: Aleppo, Syria
- Completed: 6th century
- Renovated: 11th century, 1422
- Owner: Sayf al-Dawla

Design and construction
- Known for: One of the 9 main gates of the ancient city walls of Aleppo

Bāb Antakiya (Arabic: بَاب أَنْطَاكِيَّة, romanized: Bāb ʾAnṭākīyah, Aleppo Arabic: [ˈbæːb ˈntˤaːkjɛ], "Gate of Antioch") is a critical defense gate in Aleppo, which protects the city from the west. Bab Antakiya is located in the centre of the western wall of the old city of Aleppo, and its name was derived from Antioch, the capital of ancient Syria, as the gate was the main exit which was leading to the city of Antioch.

== History ==
This gate was considered the main bab of the city during the Byzantine rule, but it lost its importance gradually during the Islamic and Arab rule, until the reconstruction by the Ayyubid Emir of Aleppo An-Nasir Yusuf (ruled 1242–60) on an 11th-century base. It was further rebuilt in the 15th century in Mamluk era when the gate regained its vital role as a main landmark for the old city.

During the Battle of Aleppo in the Syrian civil war the gate became a key target for rebel forces who tried to take the old Citadel.

== Construction ==
The gate is topped by two rising parallel hexagonal bastions with a jagged entrance path, being located under the one which is on the right side due to defensive tactics, consisted of white stones of big sizes (0.8 m (2 ft 7 in) X (1.0 m (3 ft 3 in). The main axis of the old Souq of Aleppo is originated from the Antakeya gate.
