= Religion in Syria =

Religion in Syria (ARDA 2025)
1. Sunni Islam (80.6%)
2. Shia Islam (14.1%)
3. Other Muslims (including Druze) (0.87%)
4. Christianity (2.45%)
5. No religion (1.98%)
6. Other religions (0.01%)

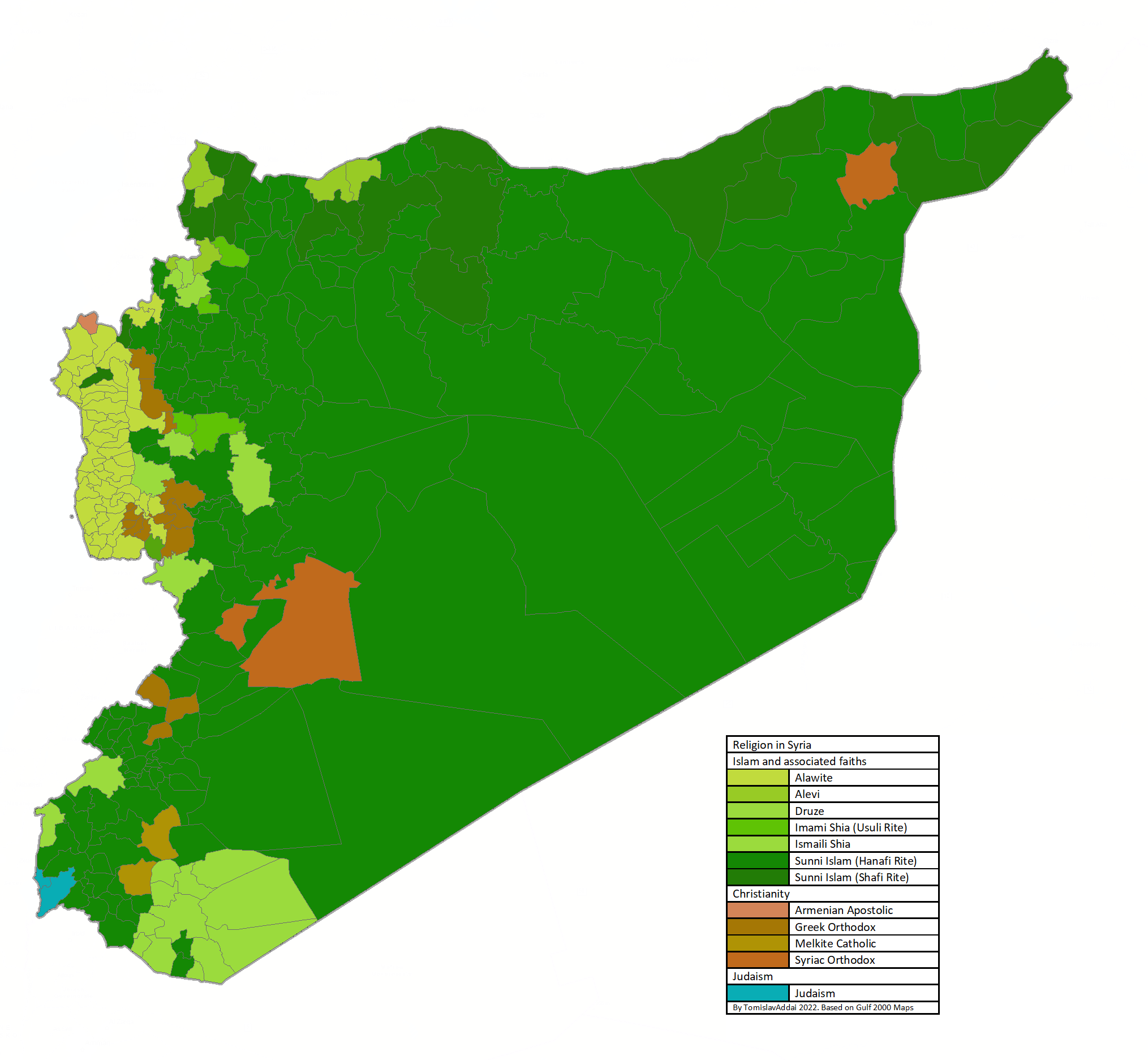
Map of the religions in Syria

Historically, the region of modern-day Syria has been a mosaic of diverse religions with a range of different sects within each of these religious communities.

The majority of Syrians are Muslims, of which the Sunnis are the most numerous (formed mostly of Arabs, Kurds, Turkmens, and Circassians), followed by the Alawites and other Shia groups (particularly Isma'ilis and Twelver Shi’ism) Druze are about 3% of the population. It has its origin in Shia Islam, but Druze do not consider themselved Muslims. In addition, there are several Christian minorities (including Greek Orthodox, Melkite Catholics, Armenian Apostolics, Armenian Catholics, Syriac Orthodox, Syriac Catholics, Assyrian Apostolic, Chaldean Catholics, Maronites, Latin Catholics, Protestants). There is also a small Yazidi community. In 2020, the Jewish Chronicle reported that there were no Jews left in Syria.

== Islam ==
=== Sunnis ===
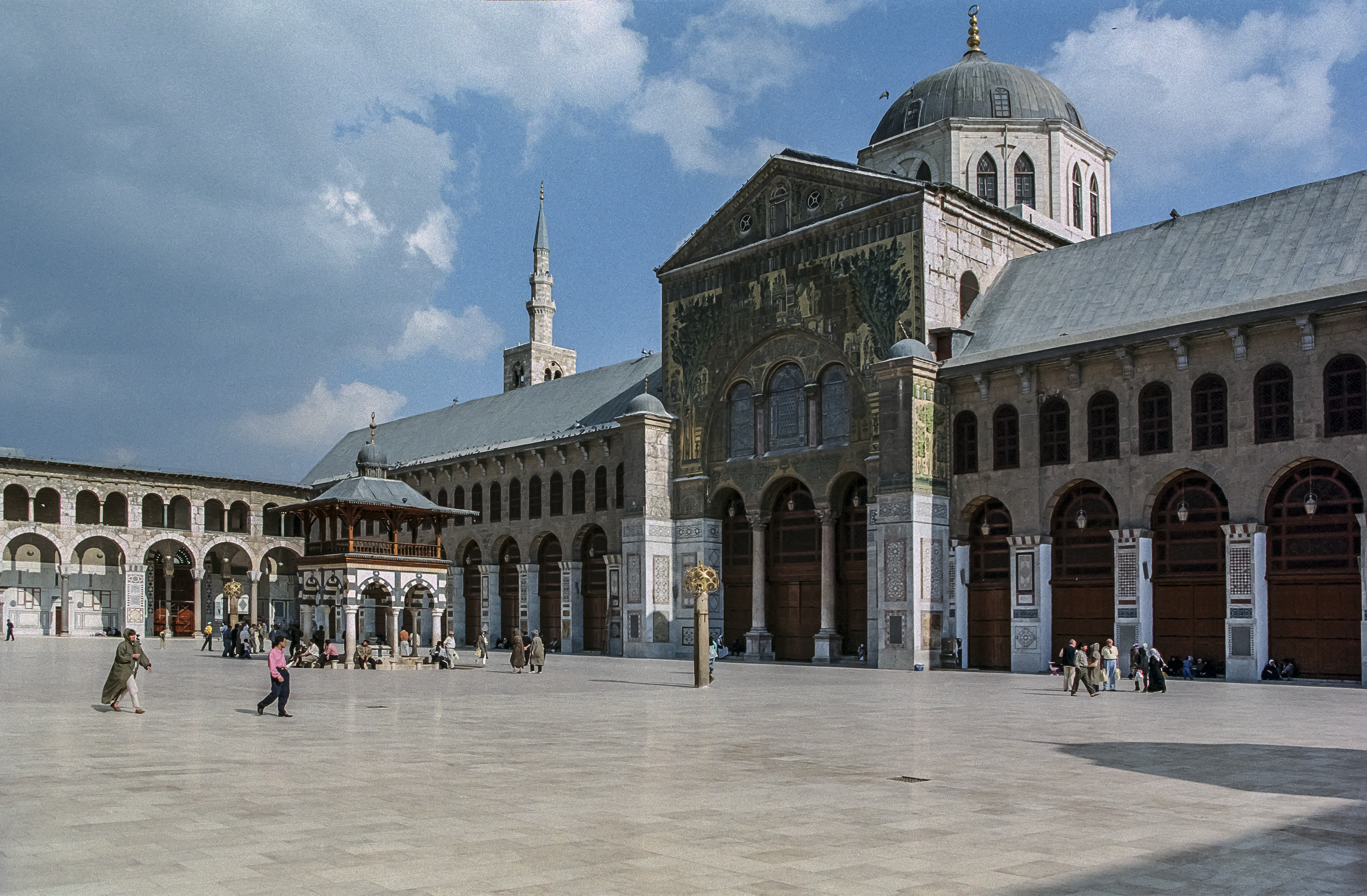
The Umayyad Mosque in Damascus

The largest religious group in Syria are Sunni Muslims. Sunnis make up about 74% of the population, of whom Arabic-speaking Sunnis form the majority, followed by the Kurds, Turkmens/Turkomans, and Circassians. The capital cities of eleven of the fourteen governorates have Sunni majority populations, except for the cities of Latakia, Tartus, and Suwayda.

Sunnis follow nearly all occupations, belong to all social groups and nearly every political party, and live in all parts of the country. There are only three governorates in which they are not a majority: Al-Suwayda, where Druzes predominate, Latakia, where Alawis are a majority, and Tartus, where Alawis are also a majority. In Al Hasakah, Sunni Kurds rather than Arabs form a majority.

Of the four major schools of Islamic law, represented in Syria are the Shafii school and the Hanafi school, which places greater emphasis on analogical deduction and bases decisions more on precedents set in previous cases than on literal interpretation of the Quran or Sunna. After the first coup d'état in 1949, the waqfs were taken out of private religious hands and put under government control. Civil codes have greatly modified the authority of Islamic laws, and before the recent upsurge in Islamism during the Syrian civil war, the educational role of Muslim religious leaders had been declining with the gradual disappearance of kuttabs, the traditional mosque-affiliated schools. Syria maintains a dual system of sharia and civil courts.

According to the US government's 2012 International Religious Freedom Report, the government of Syria was increasingly targeting members of faith groups it deemed a threat. The report said the Sunni majority is the primary persecuted group.

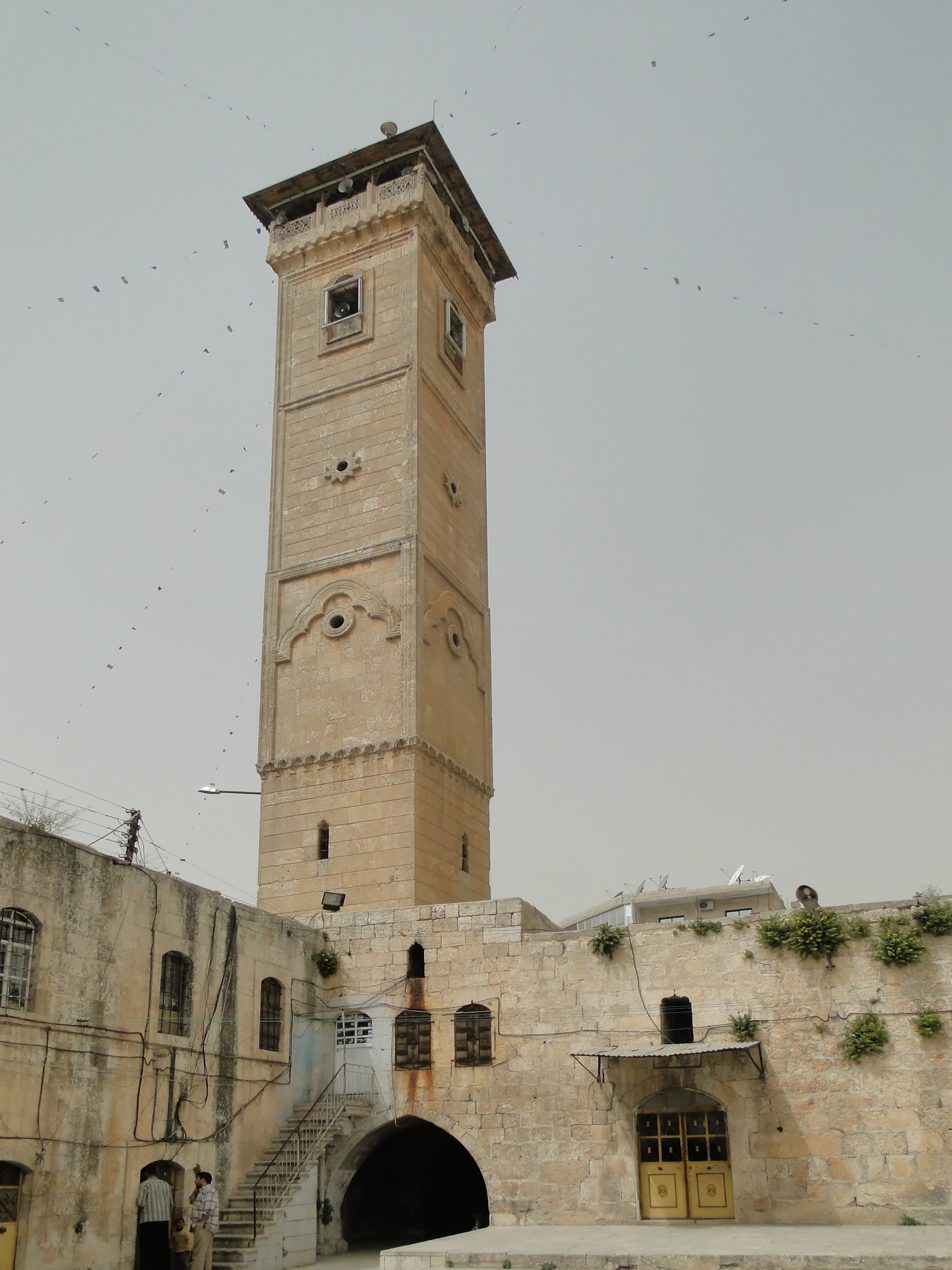
The Great Mosque of Maarrat al-Numan is a 12th-century Ayyubid-era mosque.

==== Arabs ====
Arab Sunnis form the largest Sunni Muslim community in the country. They form a majority of Sunnis in all districts of the country except for the Al-Hasakah Governorate.

In 1991, Professor Alasdair Drysdale and Professor Raymond Hinnebusch said that approximately 60% of the country was formed of Arabic-speaking Sunni Muslims. More recently, Dr. Pierre Beckouche also said that the Arab Sunni Muslims formed 60% of the population, including 500,000 Palestinian refugees.

Although the majority of Sunni Syrians are considered "Arabs", this is a term based on spoken language (Arabic), not ethnicity. Some Muslim minorities in Syria have been Arabized to some degree, particularly the smaller ethnic groups (such as the Albanians, Bosnians, Cretan Muslims, Pashtuns, Persians, etc.). Moreover, there are also some members of the larger communities, particularly within the Kurdish and Turkmen/Turkoman minorities, who no longer speak their mother tongue and have become Arabized.

==== Kurds ====
The Kurds in Syria are the second largest ethnic group in the country (around 10% in 2013) and are mainly Sunni Muslims. The majority live in Syrian Kurdistan, bordering on Iraqi Kurdistan and Turkish Kurdistan. There are also smaller Kurdish communities in Aleppo and Damascus. Damascus Kurds are very Arabized and do not usually speak Kurdish. The only governorate in which Kurds constitute a majority is the Hasakah Governorate, where they make up 60% of the population.

In 1979, Dr. Nikolaos van Dam said that the Syrian Kurds formed 8.5% of the population and were almost exclusively Sunni Muslims. In 1991, Professor Alasdair Drysdale and Professor Raymond Hinnebusch also said that approximately 8.5% of the country was formed of Sunni Muslim Kurds. More recently, Dr. Pierre Beckouche said that before 2011 the Sunni Muslim Kurds formed 9–10% of the country's total population.

==== Turkmens ====
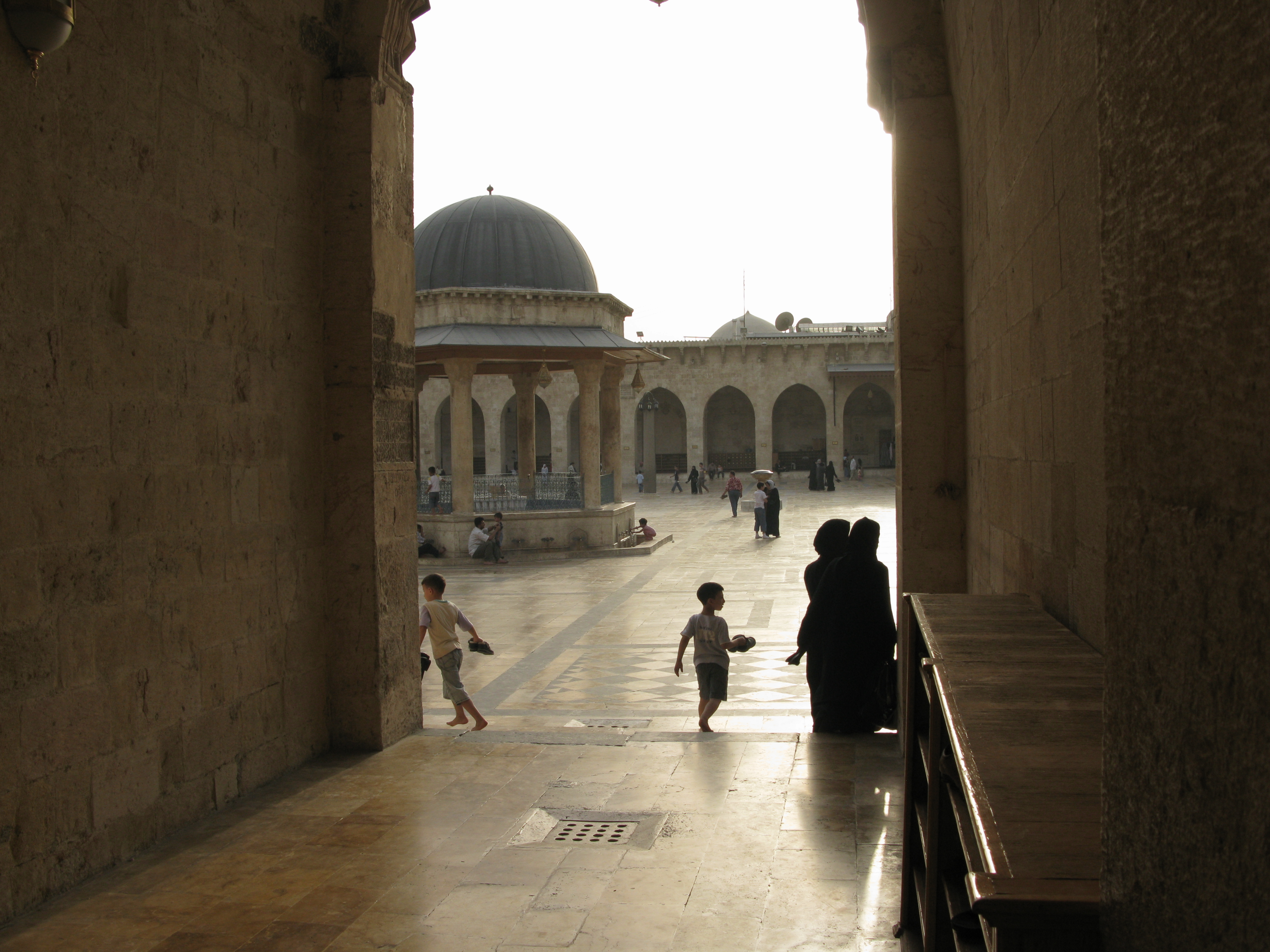
The Great Mosque of Aleppo was built by the Umayyads.

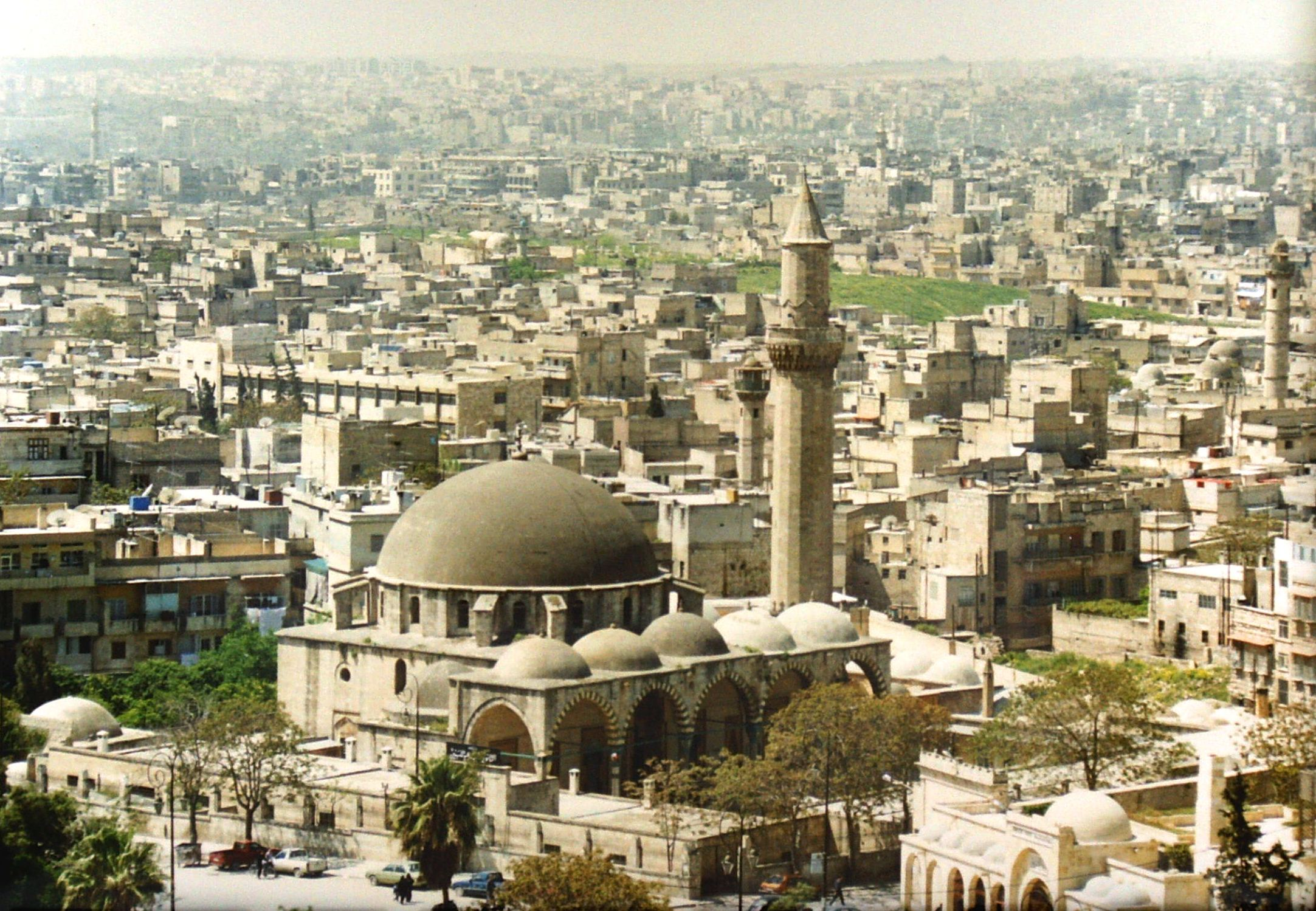
The Al-Adiliyah Mosque is a 16th-century Ottoman mosque.

The Turkish-speaking Turkmen/Turkoman are the third largest ethnic group in the country (around 4–5% in 2013); they are mainly Sunni Muslims. They mainly live in the urban centres and countryside of the following six governorates: the Aleppo Governorate, the Damascus Governorate, the Homs Governorate, the Hama Governorate, the Latakia Governorate and the Quneitra Governorate.

In 1979, Dr. Nikolaos van Dam claimed that the Syrian Turkmen/Turkoman (forming 3% of the population) were almost exclusively Sunni Muslims. By 1991 Professor Alasdair Drysdale and Professor Raymond Hinnebusch also said that approximately 3% of the country was formed of Sunni Muslim Turkmen/Turkoman. More recently, Dr. Pierre Beckouche said that before 2011 the Sunni Muslim Turkmen/Turkoman formed 4% of the country's population.

However, the Sunni Turkmen population is believed to be considerably higher if Arabized Turkmen are also taken into consideration; some estimations indicate that only 30% of Turkmen still speak their mother tongue, therefore, the Arabic-speaking Turkmen are likely to be omitted from the Sunni Turkmen population estimates.

==== Circassians ====
Most Circassians in Syria are Sunni Muslims. They form the fifth largest ethnic group in the country (around 1.5% in 2013) but the fourth largest Sunni Muslim community in Syria. They live mostly in three Syrian governorates: the Hama Governorate, the Homs Governorate and the Quneitra Governorate. Most Circassians speak very good Arabic but they have also retained their mother tongue.

In 1991, Professor Alasdair Drysdale and Professor Raymond Hinnebusch said that less than 1% of the country was formed of Sunni Muslim Circassians.

=== Shias ===
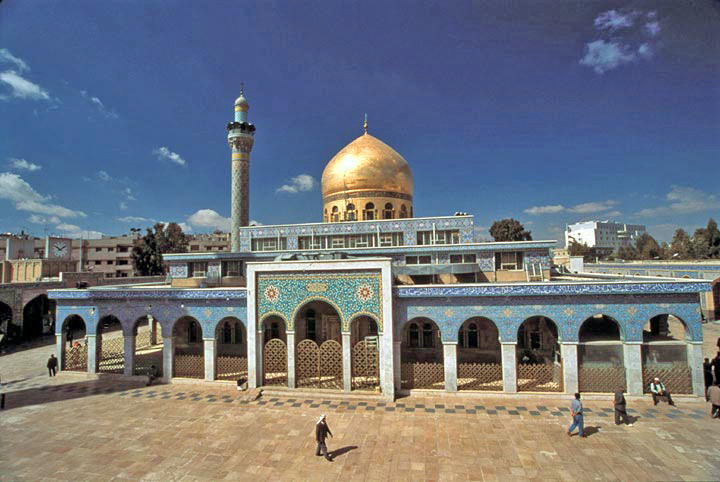
The Sayyidah Zaynab Mosque is believed to contain the grave of Zaynab built in 1990 and is a pilgrimage site for Shia Muslims, exhibits Iranian architecture.

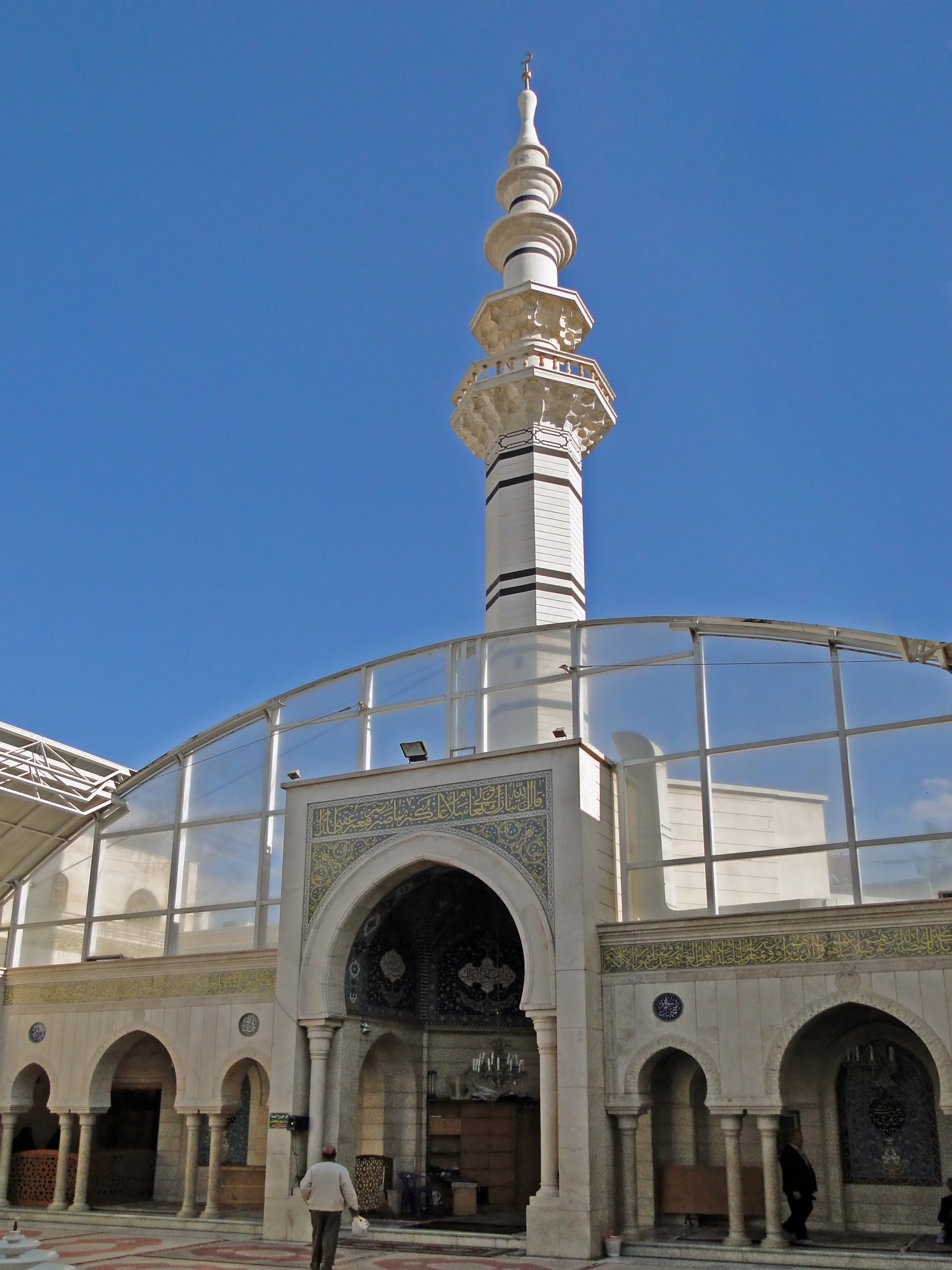
The Sayyidah Ruqayya Mosque was built in 1985 and exhibits a modern version of Iranian architecture.

Other Muslims in the country, who do not practice Sunni Islam, form up to 16% of the population and are formed of mostly Alawites (11%) and other Shias (such as twelver). These Muslim sects include diverse ethnic groups, including: Arabs, Kurds, Turkmen/Turkoman, and other smaller communities.

==== Alawites ====
The Alawites are the second largest religious group in Syria, after the Sunni Muslims. They are divided into two main groups: traditional Alawites, who form the majority, and the minority Murshid Alawites (which rose from a modern schism in the Alawite sect at the beginning of the 20th century).

In 1991, Professor Alasdair Drysdale and Professor Raymond Hinnebusch said that approximately Alawites formed 11.5% of the country's population. More recently, Dr. Pierre Beckouche said that 11% of the country's population was Alawites.

The Alawites mainly live in the Syrian Coastal Mountain Range, particularly in the countryside of the Latakia Governorate and the Tartus Governorate on the western side of the mountains, and in the countryside of the Homs Governorate and Hama Governorate on their eastern side. They form a majority (around 60%) in Latakia and Tartus. In the Homs and Hama areas, they make up around 10% of the population in both the countryside and the cities, living in Talkalakh, Al-Mukharram, Al-Qabo, Shin, Al-Riqama, the Houla plain, Maryamin, Qarmas, Al Muhani, and the areas of Zahra and Naziha.

==== Ismailis ====
The Ismailis form the second largest Shia group in the country. According to Professor Alasdair Drysdale and Professor Raymond Hinnebusch the Ismailis formed 1.5% of the country's population in 1991.

They mainly in live in two governorates: in the Hama Governorate the Ismailis mainly live in the city of Salamiyah, which is considered to be the "Ismaili capital". They also live in the city of Masyaf and in the surrounding countryside, as well as a small minority living in the city of Hama. In addition, Ismailis also live in the Tartus Governorate, particularly in the town of Qadmus and its surrounding countryside and in the district and villages of Nahr al-Khawabi.

==== Twelvers ====
The Twelvers/Imamis form the smallest of the Islamic sects in Syria, making up around 0.5% of the population. They live in the Amin neighbourhood in Damascus and in two villages close to Aleppo. The Ja’afari Shi’ites are found mainly in Qadmus, in the Tartous Governorate.

In Damascus, there are Twelvers/Imamis living near to the Shia pilgrimage sites, especially in the al-Amara-quarter which is near to Umayyad Mosque and Sayyidah Ruqayya Mosque, and around Sayyidah Zaynab Mosque. Another important site is Bab Saghir Cemetery. The Shia Twelvers in Syria have close links to the Lebanese Shi'a Twelvers. Imami Shias are also found in villages in Idlib, Homs and Aleppo provinces.

==== Alevis ====
In northern Syria, there are some Kurdish and Turkmen Alevis. The town of Maabatli in Afrin District is mainly inhabited by Kurdish Alevis. In 2014, the Alevi Hêvî Îbrahîm became the Prime Minister of the then-Kurdish controlled Afrin Canton. Thousands of Turkmen Alevis were living in Aleppo, and a significant portion of these fled to Turkey.

== Religious minorities ==
=== Druze ===
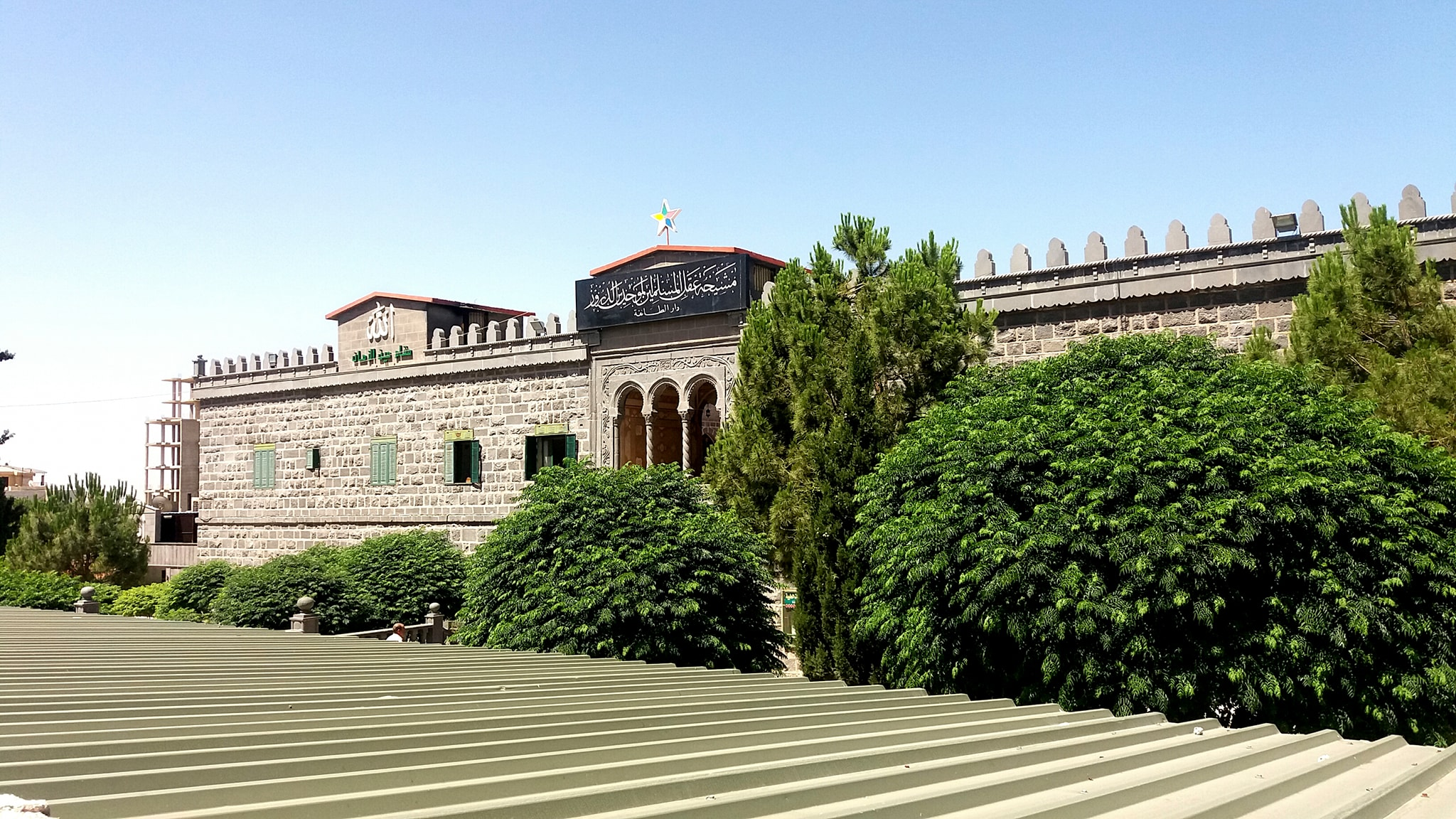
Maqam Ain al-Zaman: The headquarters of the Druze community in Syria

The Syrian Druze community constitute the third largest religion in the country, forming approximately 3% of the population of Syria. The main centre of the Druze population is in Sweida Governorate; the small towns and villages under its authority is called the Jabal al-Druze (the "Mountain of the Druze"). The rest of the community mainly live in the Quneitra Governorate, the Rif Dimashq Governorate, and Idlib Governorate. Even though the faith originally developed out of Ismaili Islam, most Druze do not identify as Muslims, and they do not accept the five pillars of Islam and believe in reincarnation.

There are many Syrian Druze also living abroad, particularly in Latin America, who have been living there for over the past hundred years. In Venezuela alone, there are approximately half a million Druze of Syrian origin.

=== Christianity ===
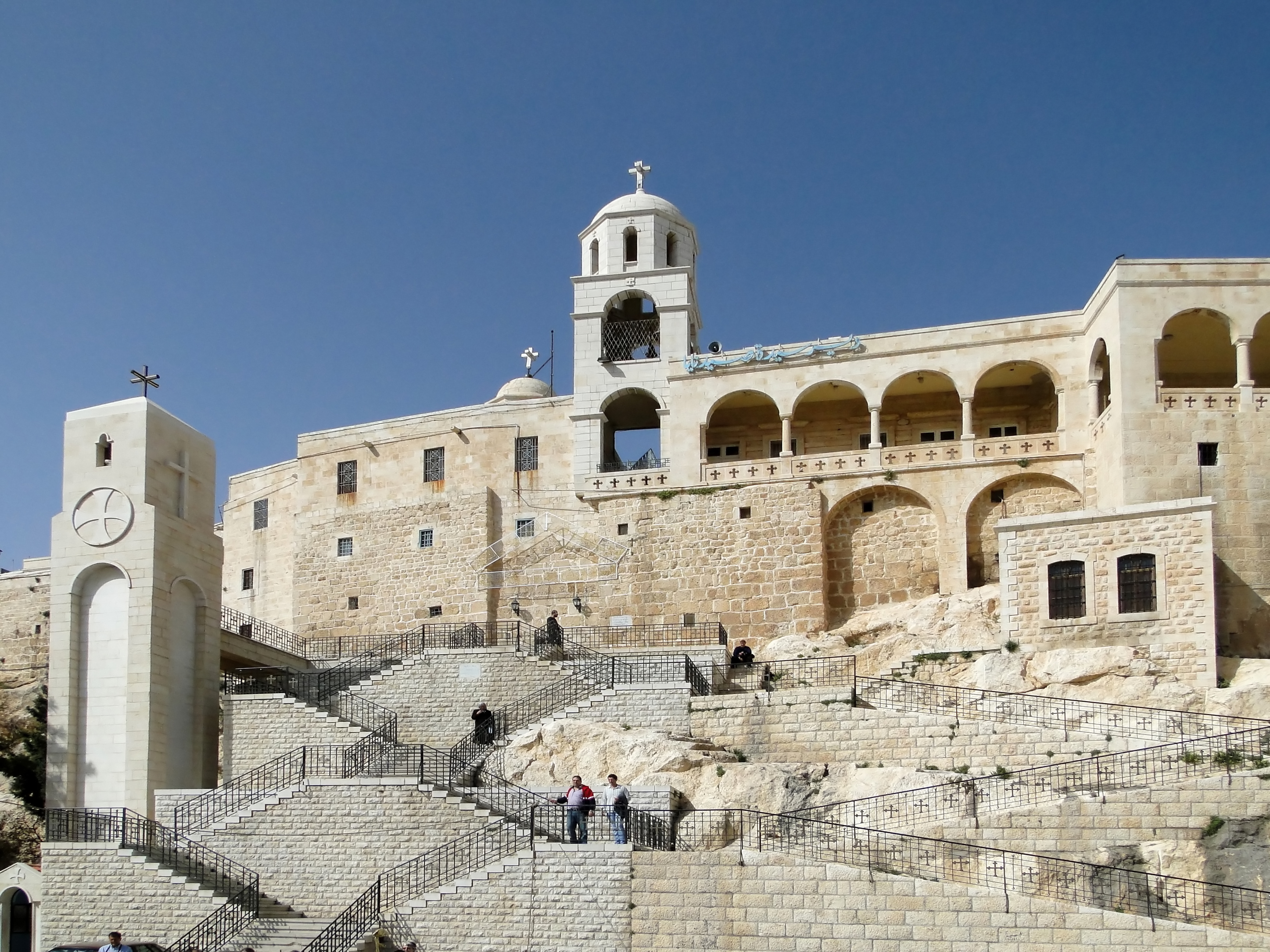
Our Lady of Saidnaya Monastery in Saidnaya, Rif Dimashq

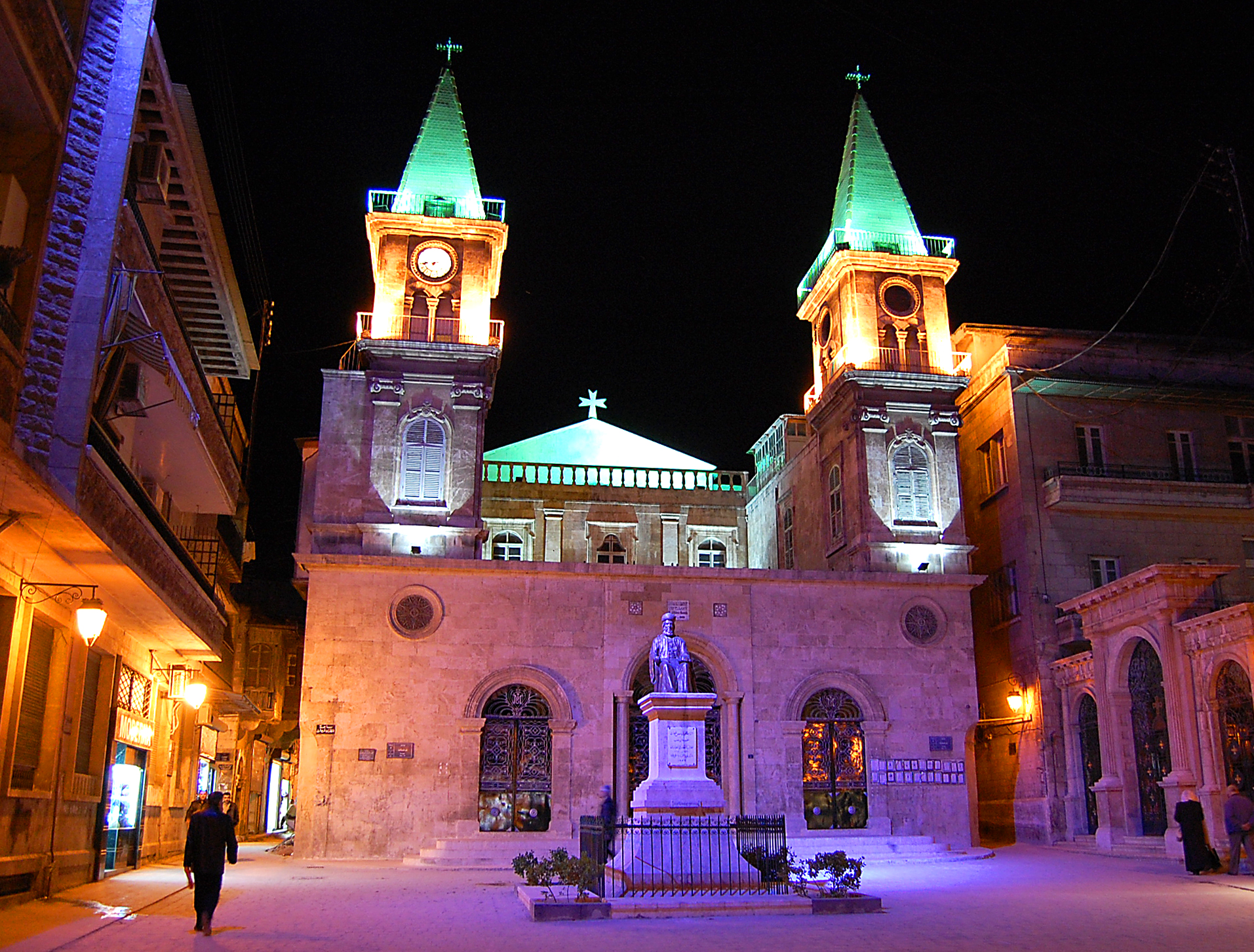
Saint Elijah Maronite Cathedral in Aleppo.

Christianity in Syria 1956
1. Eastern Orthodoxy (mainly Antiochian Greeks) (35.7%)
2. Oriental Orthodoxy (mostly Armenians and Syriacs) (33.3%)
3. Catholic Church (both Easterns and Latins) (26.2%)
4. Protestantism (2.46%)
5. Church of the East (2.31%)

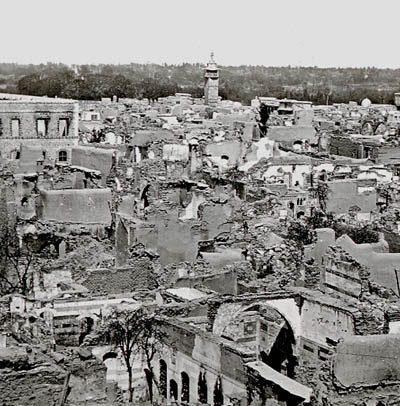
The ruins of the Christian quarter of Damascus in 1860.

The Christian communities of Syria in 2011 accounted for about 5-6% of the population. The country's largest Christian denomination was the Greek Orthodox Church of Antioch. Estimates of the number of Christians in Syria in 2022 ranged from less than 2% to around 2.5% of the Syrian population.

In 2012, Christians were split into five traditions. A primary distinguishing feature is acceptance or otherwise of the 3rd and 4th Ecumenical Councils of 431 and 451, which concerned the precise relationship of the human and divine natures of Christ. The traditions are: Oriental Orthodox (Armenian Orthodox and Syriac Orthodox) which accept the 3rd Ecumenical Council, Eastern Orthodox (such as Greeks or Russians), Roman Catholics, various Eastern Catholic Churches that are under the authority of the Pope, and Protestants who accept the 4th Ecumenical Council (two natures before and after the Incarnation in one person). The Assyrians accept only the First and Second and deny being Nestorian in doctrine (two natures in a personal non-essential union).

The Syriacs reject the 4th Council, denying being monophysites (one nature, the human being subsumed into the divine) and asserting instead that they are miaphytes (two natures united as one in one person, without separation, mixture, confusion or alteration). The East Syriac (Syro-Oriental) Rite is represented by the Assyrian Church of the East, Chaldean Catholic and Ancient Church of the East. Members of the Syriac tradition are all Eastern Aramaic–speaking ethnic Assyrians. Slight differences concerning which books of the Bible are counted as canonical are also apparent.

The total number of Christians before 2011, not including Iraqi refugee Christians, numbered about 5–6% (1.1–1.2 million) of the total population estimate (22.5 million): 500,000 Greek Orthodox, 400,000 Syriac Orthodox, 70,000–80,000 Armenian Christians (Apostolics and Catholics), 200,000 Catholics of various rites and the Assyrian Church of the East (Assyrian) numbers unknown, and Protestants. Because Protestantism was introduced by missionaries, a small number of Syrians are members of these Western denominations. The Catholics are divided into several groups: Greek Catholics (from a schism in the Greek Orthodox Patriarchate of Antioch in 1724), Latin Church Catholics, Armenian Catholics, Syriac Catholics, Chaldean Catholics and Maronites. The latter declared their allegiance to the See of St. Peter in 1182 which was confirmed by the Pope in 1100: the other Orthodox and Oriental Orthodox Rite Christians which are in union with the Papacy came into existence in the 18th and 19th centuries. Catholic and Orthodox Christians were members of one Church until 1054. The Orthodox Patriarch of Antioch ignored the split: technically this Church was in union with both Rome and Constantinople until the split in 1724 over a disputed election (the irony is that the excommunication of the Patriarch by the Pope in 1054 was invalid since he was already dead when it was delivered in Constantinople).

The vast majority of Christians belong to the Eastern communions, which have existed in Syria since the earliest days of Christianity. The Orthodox churches are autonomous; the Uniate churches, which are in communion with Rome; and the Assyrian Church of the East is independent. Even though each group forms a separate community, Christians nevertheless cooperate increasingly, largely because of their fear of the Muslim majority. In 1920 Syria was 12% Christian in a population of 1.5 million. Christians have emigrated in higher numbers than Muslims and have a lower birth rate.

Christian population in Syria has significantly diminished due to the departure of many Christians from the country amidst the Syrian civil war. Assyrian Democratic Organization (ADO), an Assyrian opposition group affiliated with the Syrian National Revolutionary Coalition (SNRC), estimated that approximately two-thirds of Syrian Christians had left the country by 2021. The estimate was also verified by other Christian organizations in Syria.

With the exception of the Armenians and Assyrians, most Syrian Christians identify ethnically as Arab Christians. Many Christians, particularly the Eastern Orthodox, have joined the Arab nationalist movement and some are changing their Aramaic or Westernized names to Arabic ones. Syrian Christians participate higher proportionally speaking in political and administrative affairs than do Muslims. Especially among the young, relations between Christians and Muslims are improving.

There are several social differences between Christians and Muslims. For example, Syrian Christians are more highly urbanized than Muslims; many live either in or around Damascus, Aleppo, Hamah, or Latakia, and there are relatively fewer of them in the lower income groups. Syrian Christians are relatively wealthy and highly educated than other Syrian religious groups.

The presence of the Christian communities is expressed also by the presence of many monasteries in several parts of the country.

=== Judaism ===
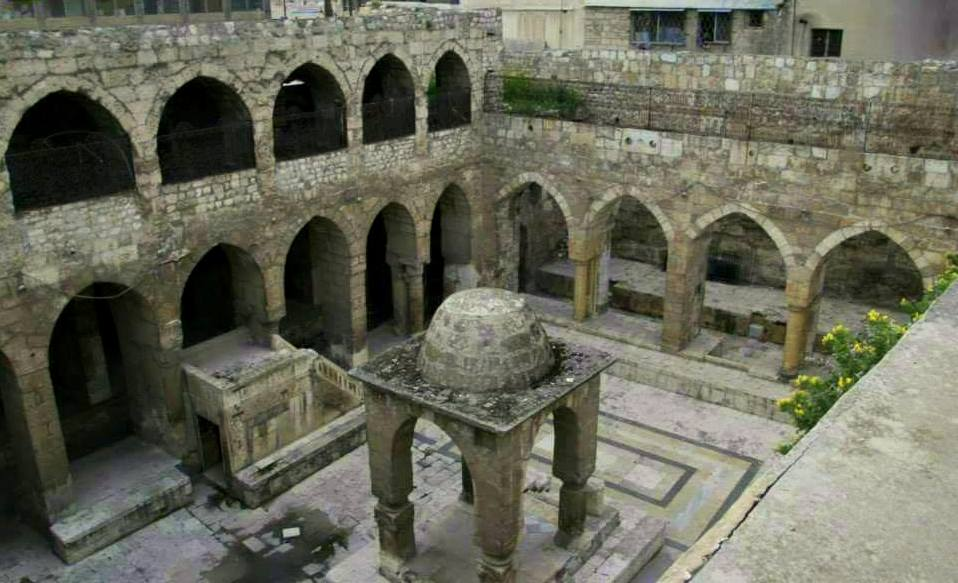
The Central Synagogue of Aleppo

Most Jews now living in the Arab World belong to communities dating back to Biblical times or originating as colonies of refugees fleeing the Spanish Inquisition.

==== Syrian Jews ====
In Syria, Jews of both origins numbered altogether fewer than 3,000 in 1987. The government treated the Jews as a religious community and not as a racial group. Official documents referred to them as musawiyin (followers of Moses) and not yahudin (Jews). The synagogues of the Jewish community had a protected status by the Syrian government.

In 2020, there were no known Jews left in the country.

==== Israeli Jews ====
The Golan Heights, which is mostly internationally recognized as part of Syria, has been occupied and governed by Israel since the Six-Day War. It has resulted in the region being settled by an influx of Israeli Jews who have become the overall majority. In 2010, the Jewish settlers had expanded to 20,000 living in 32 settlements.

=== Yazidis ===
During the fifteenth and sixteenth centuries, the Yazidis, whose religion dates back to pre-Islamic times, migrated from southern Turkey and settled in their present mountainous stronghold – Jabal Sinjar in northeastern Syria and Iraq. Although some are scattered in Iran, Turkey, and the Caucasus, Iraq is the center of their religious life, the home of their amir, and the site (north of Mosul) of the tomb of their most revered saint, Shaykh Adi.

In 1964, there were about 10,000 Yazidis in Syria, primarily in the Jazirah and northwest of Aleppo; population data were not available in 1987. Once seminomadic, most Yazidis now are settled; they have no great chiefs and, although generally Kurdish-speaking or Arabic speaking, gradually are being assimilated into the surrounding Arab population.

Yazidis generally refuse to discuss their faith which, in any case, is known fully to only a few among them. The Yazidi religion has elements of Mesopotamian religions. Currently, there are about 25,000 Yazidis in Syria.

== Folk spiritual beliefs ==
In addition to the beliefs taught by the organized religions, many people believe strongly in powers of good and evil and in the efficacy of local saints. The former beliefs are especially marked among the Arab Bedouin, who use amulets, charms, and incantations as protective devices against the evil power of jinns (spirits) and the evil eye. Belief in saints is widespread among non-Bedouin populations. Most villages contain a saint's shrine, often the grave of a local person considered to have led a particularly exemplary life. Believers, especially women, visit these shrines to pray for help, good fortune, and protection. Although the identification of the individual with their religious community is strong, belief in saints is not limited to one religious group. Persons routinely revere saints who were members of other religious communities and, in many cases, members of various faiths pray at the same shrine.

Unorthodox religious beliefs of this kind are probably more common among women than men. Because they are excluded by the social separation of the sexes from much of the formal religious life of the community, women attempt to meet their own spiritual needs through informal and unorthodox religious beliefs and practices, which are passed on from generation to generation.

== Census statistics ==
Religion in Syria (1943 census)
1. Islam (81.7%)
2. Christianity (14.1%)
3. Druze (3.05%)
4. Judaism (1.04%)
5. Yazidis (0.10%)
Religion in Syria (1953 census)
1. Islam (82.8%)
2. Christianity (13.1%)
3. Druze (3.10%)
4. Judaism (0.87%)
5. Yazidis (0.08%)

There has been no official census on Religion in Syria since the 1960s.

Religion in Syria according to censuses
		1943		1953	
		#	%	#	%
Muslims
Sunni Muslims		1 971 053	68.91%	2 578 810	70.54%
Alawites		325 311	11.37%	398 445	10.90%
Ismailis		28 527	1.00%	36 745	1.01%
Shia Muslims		12 742	0.44%	14 887	0.41%
Total Muslims		2 337 633	81.72%	3 028 887	82.85%
Christians
Greek Orthodox		136 957	4.79%	168 747	4.62%
Greek Catholics		46 733	1.63%	55 880	1.53%
Armenians	Armenian Orthodox	101 747	3.56%	110 594	3.03%
Armenians	Armenian Catholics	16 790	0.59%	19 492	0.53%
Armenians	Total	118 537	4.15%	130 086	3.56%
Assyrians	Syriac Orthodox	40 135	1.40%	51 363	1.40%
Assyrians	Syriac Catholics	16 247	0.57%	19 738	0.54%
Assyrians	Assyrian Apostolic	9 176	0.32%	11 176	0.31%
Assyrians	Chaldean Catholics	4 719	0.16%	5 492	0.15%
Assyrians	Total	70 277	2.45%	87 769	2.40%
Maronite Catholics		13 349	0.47%	16 530	0.45%
Latin Catholics		5 996	0.21%	6 749	0.18%
Protestants		11 187	0.39%	13 209	0.36%
Total Christians		403 036	14.09%	478 970	13.10%
Druze
Druzes		87 184	3.05%	113 318	3.10%
Jews
Jews		29 770	1.04%	31 647	0.87%
Yazidis
Yazidis		2 788	0.10%	3 082	0.08%
Total		2 860 411	100.00%	3 655 904	100.00%

- 1960 unofficial census with religious data:
  - Sunni Muslims: 75%
    - Alawites: 11%
    - Ismailis 1%
  - Druzes: 3%
- Total Muslims: 92.1% (4,053,349)
- Total Christians: 7.8% (344,621)
- Jews: 0.1% (4,860)
- Other: 0% (342)
- Total: 100% (4,403,172)

In the next census of 1970, the religion statistics were no longer mentioned.

=== Religion by Governorates ===
The religious compositions of different Governates as for 2011 (in %age).

Governorates	Muslims				Christians	Druze	Others
Governorates	Sunni	Alawites	Shia	Ismailis	Christians	Druze	Others
Aleppo	74	11	1.7	0.3	10	1	
Damascus	90	5	1	0.1	3	0.3	0.6
Daraa	97.5	1			1.5		
Hama	67	17	0.1	9.8	6	-	0.1
Al-Hasakah	68	>0.1	1	1.2	12.5	0.5	5
Homs	64	25	2	0.2	8	0.8	
Idlib	95	-	5				-
Latakia	36.8	57.8	0.2	0.1	5	0.1	
Quneitra							
Raqqa	96	1.5			2	-	0.5
Rif Dimashq	87	3.8	0.9	0.1	4.5	3.7	-
Suwayda	3	-	-	-	7	90	-
Tartus	18	69	-	7	6	-	-

== Other demographic estimates ==
Religion in Syria before the civil war (CIA World Factbook)
1. Sunni Islam (74%)
2. Alawites, Ismailism and Shia Islam (13%)
3. Christianity (10%)
4. Druze (3%)
Demographics of Syria, study by geographer Fabrice Balanche (2017)
1. Sunni Arabs (61%)
2. Kurds (16%)
3. Alawites (13%)
4. Druze (4%)
5. Christian (3%)
6. Turkmen (1%)
7. Shia (1%)
8. Ismaili (1%)

== Religion and law ==
In matters of personal status, such as birth, marriage, and inheritance, the Christian, Jewish, and Druze minorities follow their own legal systems. All other groups, in such matters, come under the jurisdiction of the Muslim code. However, in 2016 the de facto autonomous Federation of Northern Syria - Rojava for the first time in Syrian history introduced and started to promote civil marriage as a move towards a secular open society and intermarriage between people of different religious backgrounds. Civil marriage was later implemented nationwide.

Although the faiths theoretically enjoy equal legal status, to some extent Islam is favored. Despite guarantees of religious freedom, some observers maintain that the conditions of the non-Muslim minorities have been steadily deteriorating, especially since the June 1967 war. An instance of this deterioration was the nationalization of over 300 Christian schools, together with approximately 75 private Muslim schools, in the autumn of 1967. Since the early 1960s, heavy emigration of Christians has been noted; in fact, some authorities state that at least 50 percent of the 600,000 people who left during the decade ending in 1968 were Christians. In recent decades, however, emigration was slow until the Syrian Civil War.

=== Freedom of religion in the 2020s ===
In 2023, the country was scored 2 out of 4 for religious freedom, with the government controlling the appointment of Muslim religious leaders, restricted proselytizing, a ban on conversion of Muslims and active terror threats.

In the same year, the country was ranked as the 12th most difficult place in the world to be a Christian.

== See also ==
- Freedom of religion in Syria
- Human rights in Syria
- Religion in Lebanon
