= Islam in Syria =

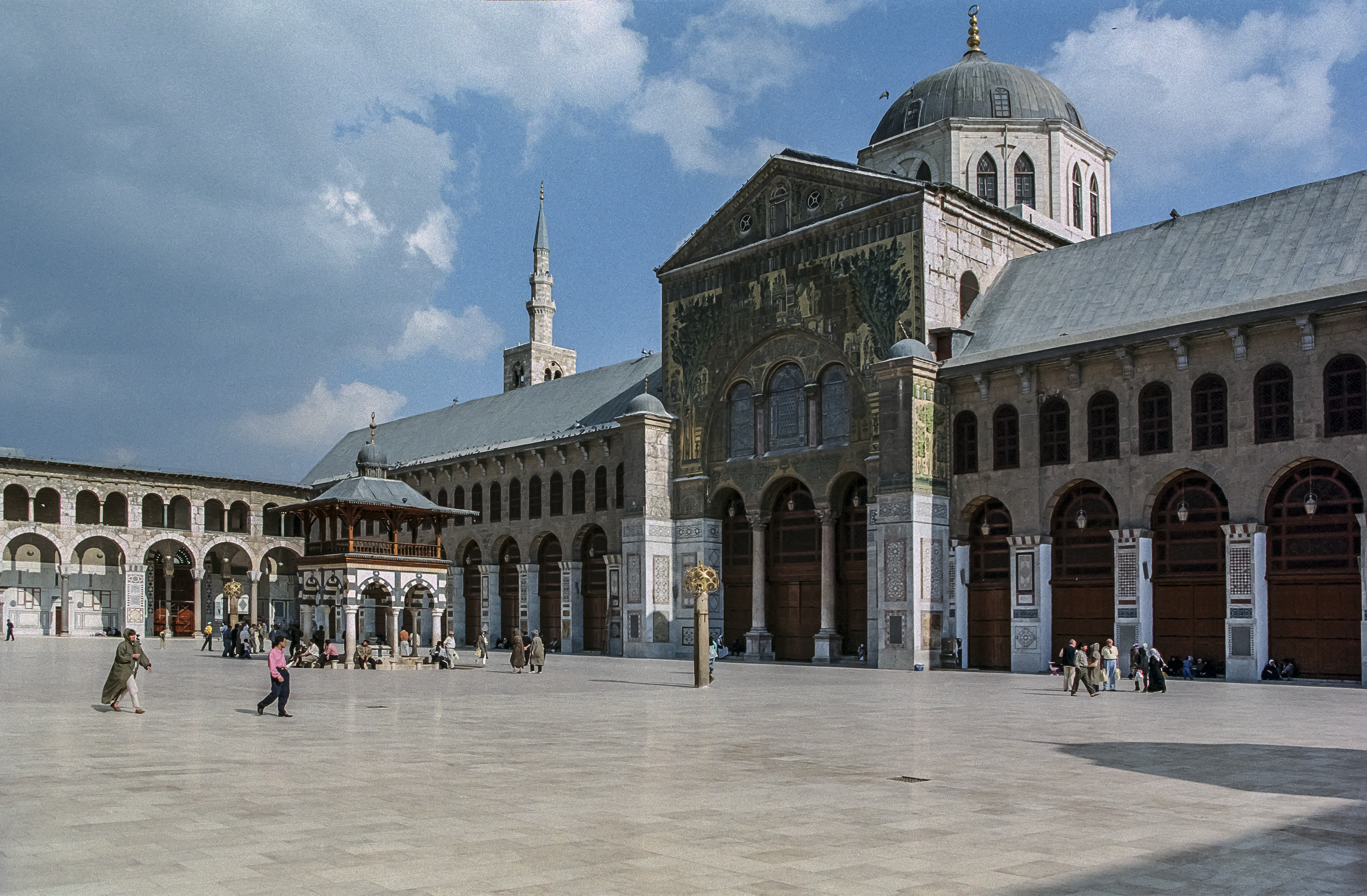
The Umayyad Mosque in Damascus.

Several different denominations and sects of Islam are practiced within Syria, who collectively constitute approximately 87% of the population and form a majority in most of the districts of the country.

The Sunni Muslims make up the vast majority in the country, mainly of the Hanafi and Shafi'i madhhabs. The Alawites are the biggest Muslim minority sect (10% of the country's population), followed by Isma'ili and Twelver Shia Muslims, which constitute about 3% percent of the country's population. Some Sufi orders are also active in the country, including the Naqshbandiya, the Qadiriya and the Shadhiliya orders, most of whom identify as Sunnis. Christianity is the second most popular religion in the country, and Christians comprises roughly 10% of the overall population. The Druze make up 3% of the population, although their association with Islam is controversial.

== History ==
Prior to the Muslim conquest of the Levant in 634, Syria was a center of Eastern Orthodox Christianity, the state religion of the Byzantine Empire. After 640, the conquest of Syria was finalized by the Muslim Arabs in the form of the Rashidun army led by Khalid ibn al-Walid, under the overall leadership of Abu Bakr, resulting in Syria becoming part of the successive Muslim states and dynasties in the region. In 635, Damascus surrendered to the Muslims and its inhabitants on conditions of security for their lives, property and churches, with the payment of a poll tax (jizya). The Umayyads made Damascus their capital, relying on the Syrian Arab tribes as their core military force, who ruled over a predominantly Aramaic-speaking population. After the demise of the Umayyads, Bilad al-Sham was a province of the successive Abbasid, Fatimid and Seljuk states.

However, although the Muslim conquest began the process of Islamization, the early converts were mainly the Arab tribes living in Syria and the Levant before the conquest, including the Tanukh and Balqayn, while in the rural sector, there is little evidence for Islamization before the tenth century. Islamization, on the other hand, mainly began in the big cities.

== Official censuses ==
=== Sects ===
Albert Hourani published statistics from a general census of Syria in 1943 giving details of religious groups of the population and the rate of growth of each (citizens were not allowed to declare their ethnicity or mother tongue):

	1943 census	1953 census	Growth
Sunnis	1,971,053 (68.91%)	2,578,810 (70.54%)	31%
Shias (Twelvers)	12,742 (0.45%)	14,887 (0.41%)	17%
Alawites	325,311 (11.37%)	398,445 (10.90%)	22%
Ismailis	28,527 (1.00%)	36,745 (1.01%)	29%
Druze	87,184 (3.05%)	113,318 (3.10%)	30%
Yezidi	2,788 (0.10%)	3,082 (0.08%)	11%
Total Muslims	2,427,605 (84.87%)	3,145,287 (86.03%)	30%

== Sunni ==
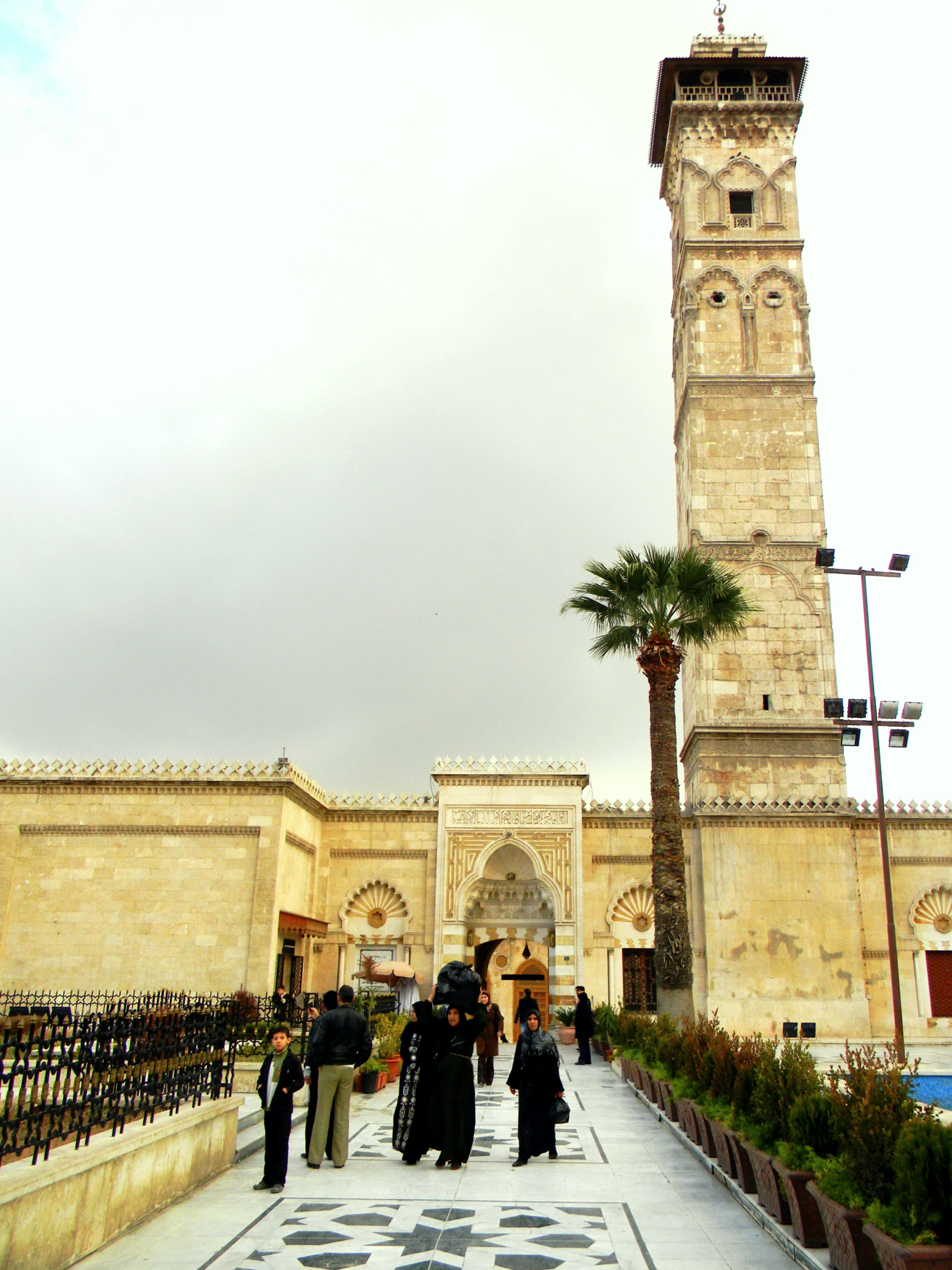
The Great Mosque of Aleppo was built by the Umayyads.

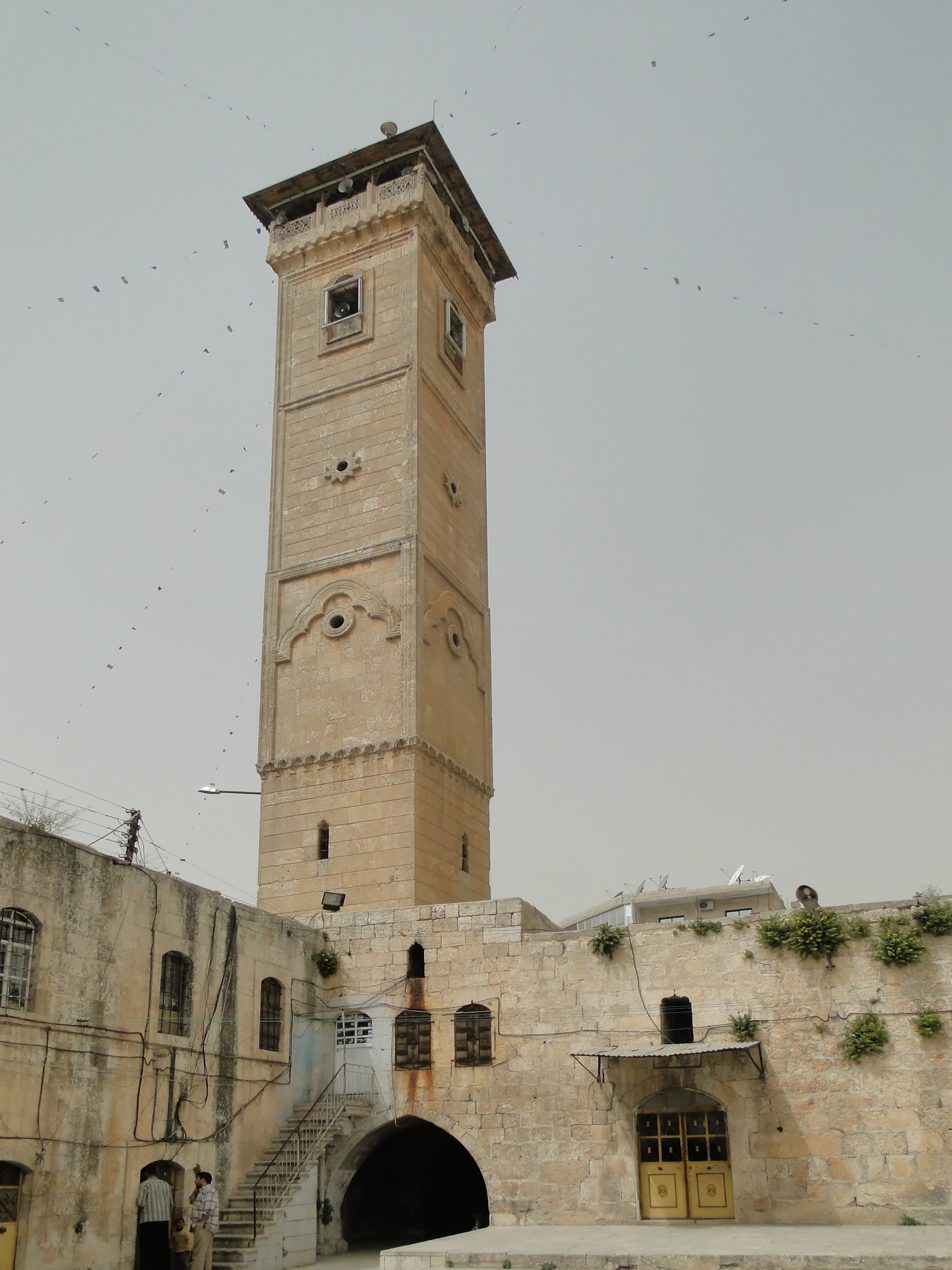
The Great Mosque of Maarrat al-Numan is a 12th-century Ayyubid-era mosque.

The largest religious group in Syria is the Sunni Muslims. The majority are formed of indigenous Syrian but there is also a significant number of Sunni Kurds, Turkmen/Turkoman, and Circassians, as well as refugees who have arrived in the country, such as Iraqis and Palestinians. Sunnis follow nearly all occupations, belong to all social groups and nearly every political party, and live in all parts of the country. All the largest cities and thirteen out of the fourteen governorates’ capitals of the country had a Sunni majority, except for the governorate and city of Suwayda. Syrian President Ahmed al-Sharaa belongs to a middle-class Syrian Sunni Muslim family.

=== Arabs ===
The Arabs form the largest Sunni Muslim community in the country. In 1991 Professor Alasdair Drysdale and Professor Raymond Hinnebusch said that approximately 60% of the country was formed of Arabic-speaking Sunni Muslims. More recently, Dr. Pierre Beckouche also said that the Arab Sunni Muslims formed 60% of the population, including 500,000 Palestinian refugees. Some Muslim minorities in Syria have been Arabized to some degree, particularly the smaller ethnic groups (such as the Albanians, Bosnians, Cretan Muslims, Pashtuns, Persians, etc.), but also some members of the larger minorities, such as the Kurds and Turkmen.

=== Kurds ===
The Kurds in Syria are the second largest ethnic group in the country (forming around 10.6% of the population) and are mainly Sunni Muslims. The majority live in the northeast, bordering on Iraq and Turkey. There are also smaller Kurdish communities in central Syria, followed by Kobanî and Afrin. In the capital of Damascus they are Arabized and do not speak Kurdish very well.

In 1973 Professor Moshe Ma'oz said that the non-Arabic-speaking Sunni Muslim Kurds formed 8.3% of the population. By 1979 Dr. Nikolaos van Dam claimed that the Syrian Kurds (forming 8.5% of the population at the time) were almost exclusively Sunni Muslims. Dr Henry Munson said that Sunni Muslim Kurds formed 9% of the population in 1988, whilst Professor Alasdair Drysdale and Professor Raymond Hinnebusch said that they formed 8.5% in 1991. In recent decades, the population of other religious minorities (particularly Christians and Jews) has decreased, therefore, estimates on the proportion of Sunni Kurds have increased. For example, Dr. Pierre Beckouche has said that before 2011 the Sunni Muslim Kurds formed 9-10% of the country's population.

=== Turkmen ===
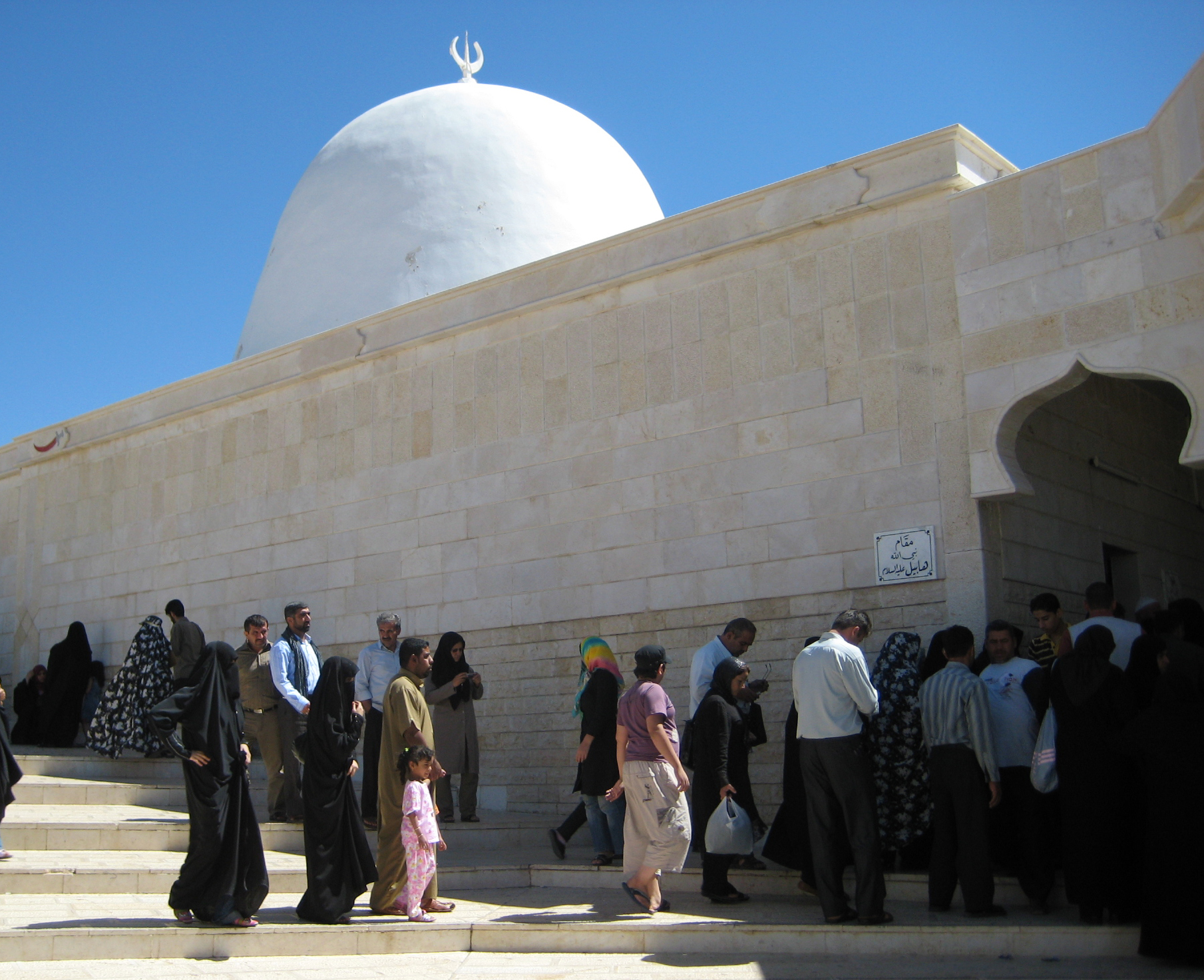
The Nabi Habeel Mosque is a 16th-century Ottoman mosque.

The Turkish-speaking Turkmen are the third largest ethnic group in the country (approximately 4% to 5% of the country's population) and are mainly Sunni Muslims. They mainly live in the urban centres and countryside of the following six governorates: the Aleppo Governorate, the Damascus Governorate, the Homs Governorate, the Hama Governorate, the Latakia Governorate and the Quneitra Governorate.

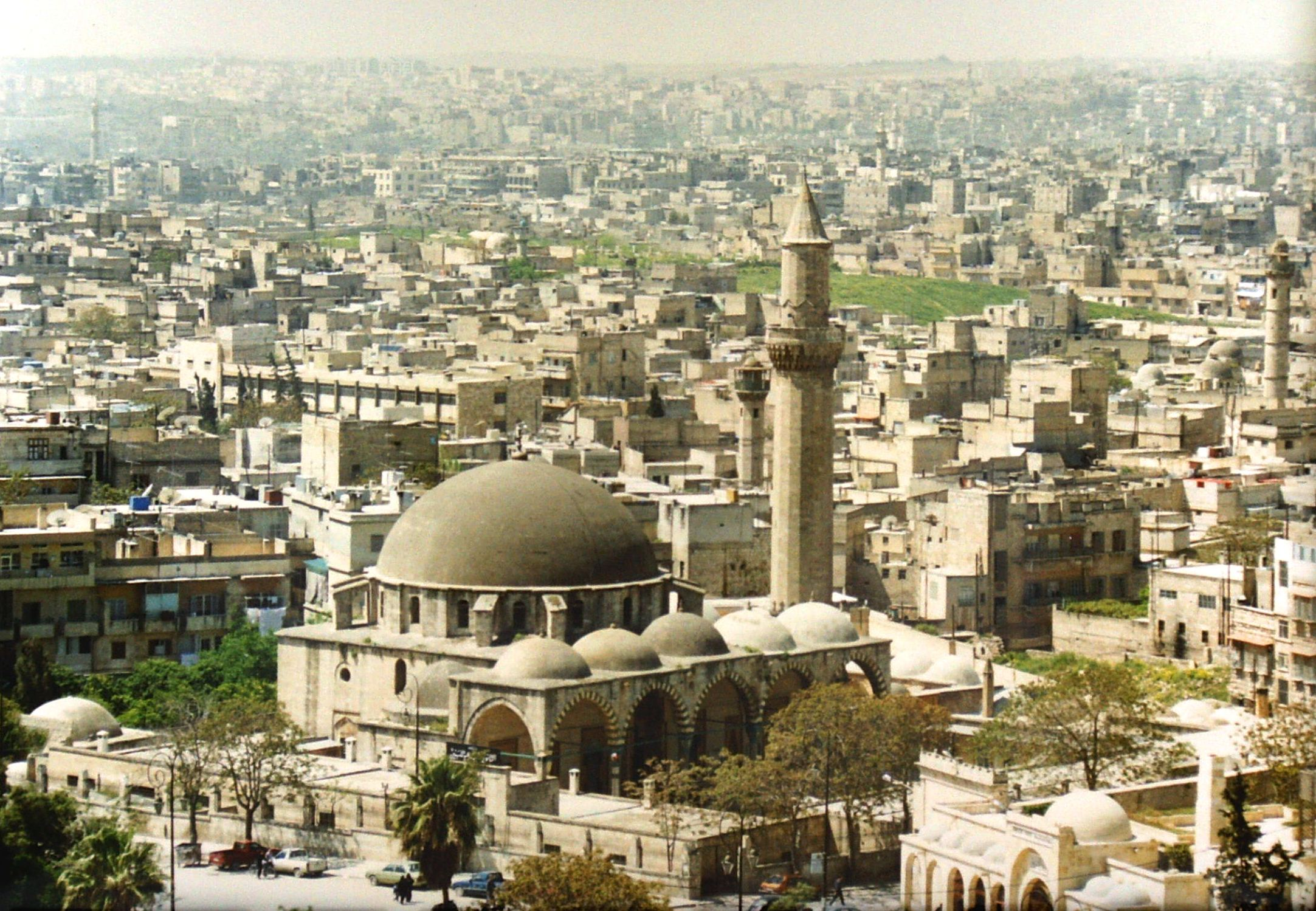
The Al-Adiliyah Mosque is a 16th-century Ottoman mosque.

In 1973 Professor Moshe Ma'oz said that the non-Arabic-speaking Sunni Muslim Turkmen formed 3% of the population. According to Dr. Nikolaos van Dam the Syrian Turkmen/Turkoman (forming 3% of the population at the time) were almost exclusively Sunni Muslims. Similarly, Dr Henry Munson said that Sunni Muslim Turkmen formed 3% of the population in 1988, as did Professor Alasdair Drysdale and Professor Raymond Hinnebusch in 1991. In recent decades, the population of other religious minorities (particularly Christians and Jews) has decreased, therefore, estimates on the proportion of Sunni Turkmen has increased. For example, Dr. Pierre Beckouche said that before 2011 the Sunni Muslim Turkmen/Turkoman formed 4% of the country's population.

However, the Sunni Turkmen population is believed to be considerably higher if Arabized Turkmen are also taken into consideration (i.e. Arabic-speaking Turkmen who no longer speak their mother tongue), and some estimates indicate that the total Turkmen population (who are mostly Sunni) might be the second biggest group in the country, outnumbering the Kurds.

=== Circassians ===
Most Circassians in Syria are Sunni Muslims. They form the fifth largest ethnic group in the country but the fourth largest Sunni Muslim community in Syria. They live mostly in three Syrian governorates: Hama, Homs, and Quneitra.

In 1991 Professor Alasdair Drysdale and Professor Raymond Hinnebusch said that less than 1% of the country was formed of Sunni Muslim Circassians. In recent decades, the population of other religious minorities (particularly Christians and Jews) has decreased, therefore, estimates on the proportion of Sunni Circassians has increased. For example, a more recent estimate suggested that Sunni Circassians formed 1.5% of Syria's population.

== Alawites ==
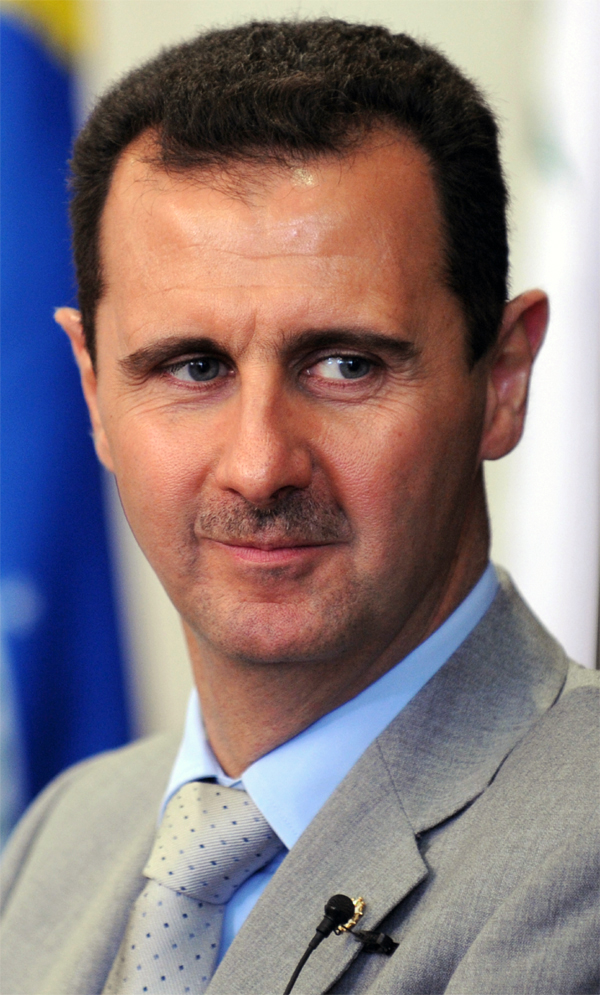
Former Syrian President Bashar al-Assad is an Alawite.

The Alawites are the second largest religious group in Syria, after the Sunni and Shi'a Muslims. Hafez al-Assad and his son, former President Bashar al-Assad, belong to the Alawite sect.

Alawites are divided into two main groups: traditional Alawites, who form the majority, and the minority Murshidites, which rose from a modern schism in the Alawite sect at the beginning of the 20th century.

In 1991 Professor Alasdair Drysdale and Professor Raymond Hinnebusch said that Alawites formed approximately 11.5% of the country's population. More recently, Dr. Pierre Beckouche said that 11% of the country's population was Alawite before 2011. The CIA has estimated Alawites at 15% of the Syria's population.

The Alawites mainly live in the Syrian Coastal Mountain Range, particularly in the countryside of the Latakia Governorate and the Tartus Governorate on the western side of the mountains, and in the countryside of the Homs Governorate and Hama Governorate on their eastern side. They form a majority (around 60%) in Latakia and Tartus. In the Homs and Hama areas, they make up around 10% of the population in both the countryside and the cities, living in Talkalakh, Al-Mukharram, Al-Qabu, Shin, Al-Riqama, the Houla plain, Maryamin, Qarmas, Al Muhani, and the areas of Zahra and Naziha.

== Alevis ==
In northern Syria there are some Kurdish and Turkmen Alevi. The town of Maabatli in Afrin district is majority inhabited by Kurdish Alevis. In 2014 Hêvî Îbrahîm, an Alevi, became the Prime Minister of the Kurdish-controlled Afrin Canton. Thousands of Turkmen Alevis are living in Aleppo, though many of them fled to Turkey.

== Shia ==
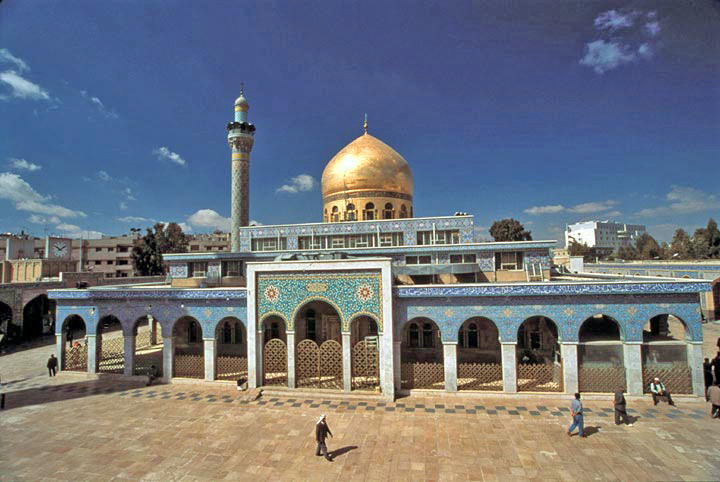
The Sayyidah Zaynab Mosque is believed to contain the grave of Zaynab and is a pilgrimage site for Shia Muslims.

The first largest sect of Islam practiced in the country is the Shia branch; this includes Ismailis and Twelvers. Before 2011, they formed a sizeable minority. These Muslim sects also include diverse ethnic groups, which included: the Arabs, Kurds, Turkmen, and other smaller communities.

=== Ismailis ===
The Shia Ismailis form the largest branch of Shia Islam in Syria, forming 3% of Syria's population. The split from the greater branch occurred over the recognition of the Seventh Imam. Shia Ismailis believe that Ja'far al-Sadiq, the Sixth Imam, appointed Isma'il to be the Seventh Imam, a line that continues unbroken to the present day, the office currently sitting with His Highness the Aga Khan. The Shia Ithna Asharia, however, believe that Jafar appointed Isma'il's brother Musa al Kadhim to be the Seventh Imam, a line of Imamat that ended with the 12th Imam of the Ithna Asharia. Little is known of the early history of the sect, but it was firmly established by the end of the ninth century. From 969 to 1171, an Ismaili dynasty, the Fatimids, ruled as caliphs in Egypt. The Ismaili power in Syria was stamped out by the Mamluk dynasty of Egypt, after the former offered the Crusaders their allegiance and conversion to Christianity – which were rejected by the Knights Templar.

Ismailis are divided into two major groups: the Mustali and the Nizari.

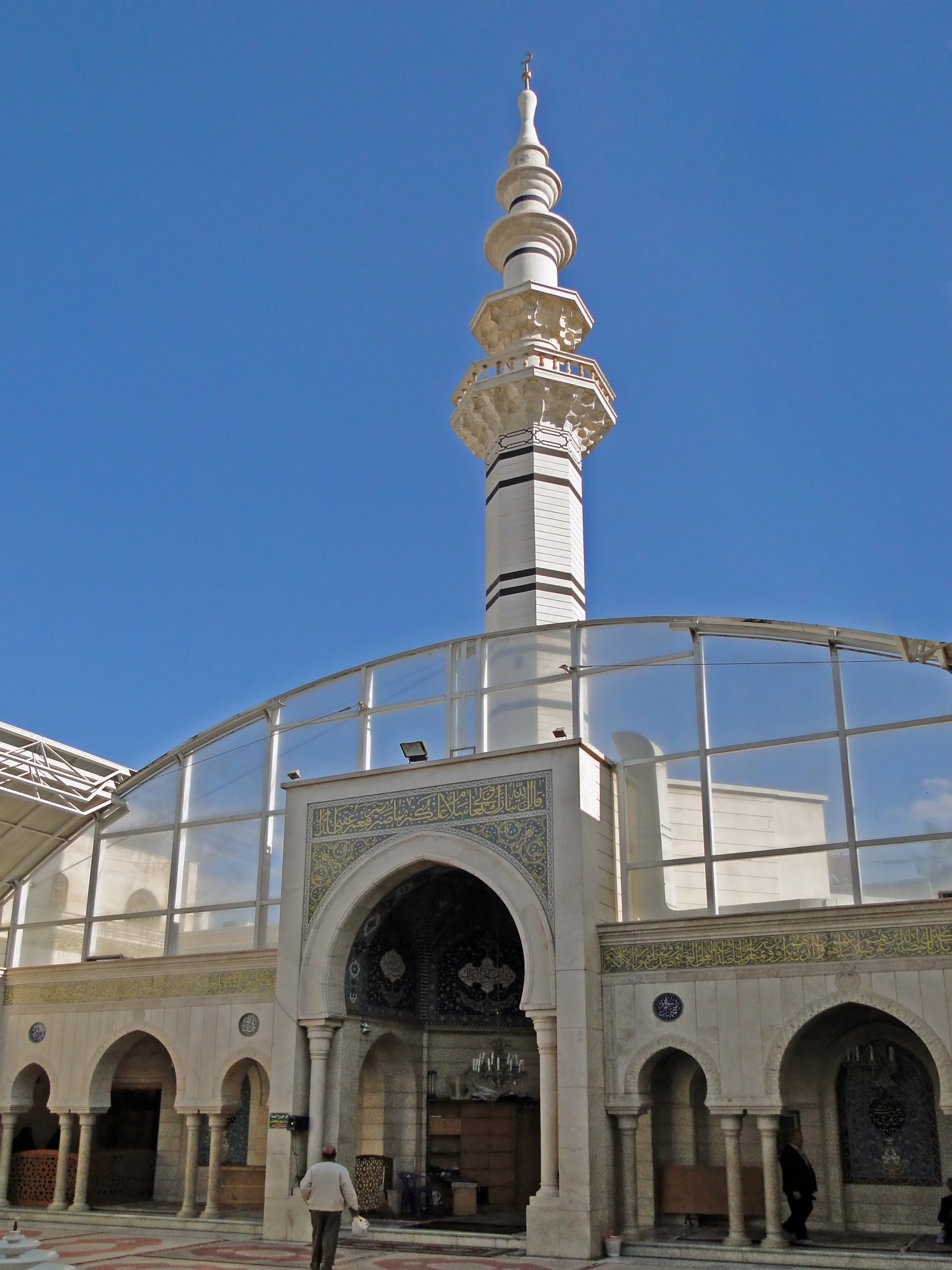
The Sayyidah Ruqayya Mosque was built in 1985 and exhibits a modern version of Iranian architecture.

According to Professor Alasdair Drysdale and Professor Raymond Hinnebusch the Ismailis formed 1.5% of the country's population in 1991. They mainly in live in two governorates: in the Hama Governorate the Ismailis mainly live in the city of Salamiyah, which is considered to be the "Ismaili capital". They also live in the city of Masyaf and in the surrounding countryside, as well as a small minority living in the city of Hama. In addition, Ismailis also live in the Tartus Governorate, particularly in the town of Qadmus and its surrounding countryside and in the district and villages of Nahr al-Khawabi.

=== Twelver ===
Forming the smallest of the Islamic sects in Syria at 2%, the Twelver Shia play only a minor role in Syrian politics. In religious affairs, they look to Shia centers in Iraq, especially Karbala and Najaf, and to Iran. However, Iran's 1979 Islamic Revolution and Syria's alliance with Iran in its war with Iraq, have elevated the prestige of Syria's Shia minority. As hundreds of Iranian tourists began to visit Damascus each week, the Shia shrine of the tomb of Sayyida Zaynab, granddaughter of Muhammad, located in Al-Ghutah outside Damascus, became a major pilgrimage destination, replacing those areas no longer accessible in Iraq. Moreover, the Syrian Shia Twelvers have close links to the Shia Twelvers in Lebanon.

== Druze ==
The Syrian Druze community constitute the third largest Islamic influenced sect in the country, they are not traditionally considered as Muslims, forming approximately 4% of the population of Syria. The main centre of the Druze population is in As-Suwayda; the small towns and villages under its authority is called the Jabal al-Druze (the "Mountain of the Druze"). The rest of the community mainly live in the Quneitra Governorate, the Rif Dimashq Governorate, and the Idlib Governorate. Even though the faith originally developed out of Ismaili Islam, most Druze do not identify as Muslims, and they do not accept the five pillars of Islam.

There are many Syrian Druze that are also living abroad, particularly in Latin America, who have been living there for over the past hundred years. In Venezuela alone there are approximately half a million Druze of Syrian origin.

== Ahmadiyya ==
The history of the movement in Syria begins in the 1920s, when the second caliph of the Community, Mirza Basheer-ud-Din Mahmood Ahmad visited Damascus, as part of his tour of Europe and the Middle East. The caliph appointed Sayyid Zayn al'Abidin Waliullah Shah and Jalal al-Din Shams to be sent for missionary work in Damascus. Along with Maulvi Abu'l-'Ata Jalandhari, who arrived for a mission in Jerusalem, the three missionaries spent their time spreading Ahmadi teachings in major towns and cities across the Middle East, including Haifa, Beirut and Cairo.

== Quraniya ==
There is also a Quraniya or Quranist community within Syria, whose early documentation began forming in the 19th century and followed the teachings set forth by the Indian theologian Seyyid Ahmed Khan Hindi and then spread to Syria soon afterwards via intermediary pilgrims. However, Ahl al-Qur'an adherents precede these 19th century developments in the form of Mu'tazilites such as Ibrahim al-Nazzam, who lived for some period in these environs. Contemporary adherents of the Quranist point of view in Syria include Muhammad Shahrur.

== See also ==
- Islamization
- Spread of Islam
- Muslim conquests
- List of mosques in Syria
- Religion in Syria

== Bibliography ==
- Drysdale, Alasdair; Hinnebusch, Raymond A. (1991), Syria and the Middle East Peace Process, Council on Foreign Relations, ISBN 0876091052
- Khalifa, Mustafa (2013), "The impossible partition of Syria", Arab Reform Initiative, archived from the original on 2016-10-09
- Khan, Adil Hussain (2015), From Sufism to Ahmadiyya: A Muslim Minority Movement in South Asia, Indiana University Press, ISBN 978-0-253-01529-7
- Ma'oz, Moshe (1973), "Syria", in Milson, Menahem (ed.), Society and Political Structure in the Arab World, Humanities Press, ISBN 0391002589
- Munson, Henry (1988), Islam and Revolution in the Middle East, Yale University Press, ISBN 0300046049
- Pierre, Beckouche (2017), "The Country Reports: Syria", Europe's Mediterranean Neighbourhood, Edward Elgar Publishing, ISBN 978-1786431493
- Van Dam, Nikolaos (1979), The Struggle for Power in Syria, Taylor & Francis, ISBN 9780856647031
