= Alasdair Drysdale =

Alasdair Drysdale (born 1950) is professor emeritus of geography and formerly associate dean of the College of Liberal Arts at the University of New Hampshire.

== Education ==
Drysdale was educated at Strathallan School near Perth, Scotland. He studied at Durham University gaining a BA (Hons) in modern middle eastern studies (geography and Arabic) in 1971 and an MA in geography in 1972. In 1977 he was awarded a PhD in geography from the University of Michigan.

== Research ==
Drysdale's expertise encompasses human geography, political geography, and population and development in the non-western world, specifically, Syria and the Middle East. His early research focused on Syria and its internal complexities as well as its external relationships with its neighbours in the Middle East and countries further afield. More recently, his research has centred on the rapid ageing of the population in the Middle East, and responses to that growth in Oman and Jordan.

In 1990 he gave a prepared statement on Syria to the United States House Foreign Affairs Subcommittee on Europe and the Middle East regarding The Middle East in the 1990s.

Drysdale serves on the editorial board of The Northeastern Geographer (2007–) and the Arab World Geographer (1998–), for whom he was also the North American book review editor (1998–2007). He also served on the international advisory board of the journal Geopolitics (1996–2007).

== Publications ==
Drysdale has authored books, book chapters and articles. He has provided country profiles for inclusion in various encyclopaedias, yearbooks and atlases. Entries include: Syria and Libya in the Colliers Yearbook from 1980 to 1997, Compton's Encyclopedia, Cambridge Encyclopedia of the Middle East, Oxford Companion to Politics of the World, Funk & Wagnalls New Encyclopedia and Earth: The Comprehensive Atlas.

=== Books ===
- Clive Schofield; David Newman; Alasdair Drysdale; Janet Allison Brown, eds. (2002). The Razor's Edge: International Boundaries and Political Geography. London: Kluwer Law International. ISBN 978-9041198747.
- Alasdair Drysdale and Raymond A Hinnebusch (1991). Syria and the Middle East Peace Process. New York: Council on Foreign Relations. p. 1. ISBN 978-0876091050. "syria and the middle east peace process."
- Alasdair Drysdale and Gerald Blake (1985). The Middle East and North Africa: A Political Geography. New York: Oxford University Press. ISBN 978-0195035384.

=== Book chapters ===
- Drysdale, Alasdair (2002). "Oman's non-Omani Population: A Geographic and Demographic Profile". In Clive Schofield; David Newman; Alasdair Drysdale; Janet Allison Brown (eds.). The Razor's Edge: International Boundaries and Political Geography. London: Kluwer Law International. pp. 513–529. ISBN 978-9041198747.
- Drysdale, Alasdair (1998). "Foreign Aid to the Middle East". In Richard Grant; Jan Nijman (eds.). The Global Crisis in Foreign Aid. Syracuse, New York: Syracuse University Press. pp. 77–88. ISBN 978-0815627722.
- Drysdale, Alasdair (1994). "Transboundary Interaction and Political Conflict in the Central Middle East: The Case of Syria". In Clive H Schofield; Richard N Schofield (eds.). The Middle East and North Africa: World Boundaries. Vol. 2. London and New York: Routledge. pp. 21–34. ISBN 978-0415088398.
- Drysdale, Alasdair (1993). "Syria Since 1988: From Crisis to Opportunity". In Robert Freedman (ed.). The Middle East after Iraq's Invasion of Kuwait. Gainesville, Florida: University Press of Florida. pp. 276–296. ISBN 978-0813012148.
- Drysdale, Alasdair (1991). "The Gulf of Aqaba: An Evolving Border Landscape". In Julian Minghi; Dennis Rumley (eds.). The Geography of Border Landscapes. London and New York: Routledge. pp. 203–216. ISBN 978-0415048255.
- Drysdale, Alasdair (1988). "National Integration Problems in the Arab World: The Case of Syria". In Ron Johnston; David Knight; Eleonore Kofman (eds.). Nationalism, Self-Determination and Political Geography. London and New York: Croom Helm. pp. 87–101. ISBN 978-0709914808.
- Drysdale, Alasdair (1987). "Regional Growth and Change in Syria since 1963". In J A Allan (ed.). Politics and the Economy in Syria. London: School of Oriental Studies.
- Drysdale, Alasdair (1982). "Syrian Armed Forces in National Politics: The Role of the Geographic and Ethnic Periphery". In Roman Kolkowicz; Andrzej Korbonski (eds.). Soldiers, Peasants and Bureaucrats: Civil Military Relations in Communist and Modernizing Societies. London: Allen and Unwin. pp. 52–76. ISBN 978-0043220078.
- Drysdale, Alasdair (1978). "The Alawis of Syria". In Georgina Ashworth (ed.). World Minorities. Vol. 2. London: Quartermaine House. pp. 1–5. ISBN 978-0905898018.
