= Rumley =

Rumley may refer to:

People:

- Dennis Rumley, Australian academic
- Johnny Rumley, former NASCAR driver 1944

Places:

- Rumley, Arkansas, unincorporated community in Van Buren County, Arkansas, United States
- Rumley, Ohio, in Shelby County
- Rumley Township, Harrison County, Ohio, one of the fifteen townships of Harrison County, Ohio, United States
- New Rumley, Ohio, unincorporated community in central Rumley Township, Harrison County, Ohio, United States
- Rumley, Texas, unincorporated community in Lampasas County
