= David Newman (political geographer) =

British-Israeli scholar (born 1956)

- דיויד ניומן
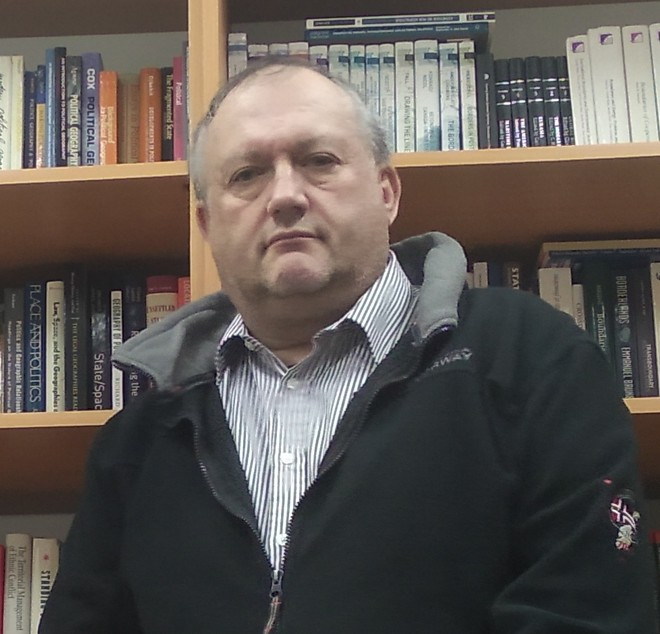
- David Newman
- Born: 4 July 1956 (age 70); London, England, UK
- Education: Durham University, University of London
- Known for: Geopolitics, Borders, Territory in the Israeli–Palestinian conflict
- Scientific career
- Fields: Political geography; Geopolitics
- Workplaces: Ben Gurion University of the Negev, Tel Aviv University
- Website: david-newman.net

David Newman OBE (Hebrew: דיויד ניומן; born 4 July 1956) is a British-Israeli scholar in political geography and geopolitics. He is a professor at the Ben-Gurion University of the Negev (BGU) Department of Politics and Government and was this department's first chairperson. Newman also served for many years as chief editor of the academic journal Geopolitics and as dean of BGU's Faculty of Humanities and Social Sciences.

== Childhood and education ==
David Newman was born in London in 1956. He grew up in North London, where both his father and grandfather were Rabbis at various synagogues.

He holds an Honours Bachelor of Arts in Geography from Queen Mary College at the University of London (1978) and a PhD in Geography and Middle Eastern Studies from the University of Durham (1981).

He completed his PhD on the topic of Gush Emunim and West Bank Settlement Activity under the tutelage of political geographer Professor Gerald Blake. In 1982 he emigrated to Israel.

== Academic career ==
In Israel, he was appointed as lecturer in the Tel Aviv University Department of Geography. At Tel Aviv, he worked alongside Israeli political geographer and cartographer Professor Moshe Brawer and Israeli regional planner Professor Elisha Efrat.

From 1983-1986, Newman was also a researcher at the Centre for Settlement Research in Rehovot, where he worked alongside Professor Raanan Weitz and Dr. Leviah Applebaum which focused on new modes of settlement planning in Israel, and a study of the functioning of local government (the Regional Councils) in the country’s rural areas.

In 1987 he became a senior lecturer in the Department of Geography at Ben-Gurion University of the Negev. From 1996 to 1998, he served as the Hubert Humphrey Institute for Social Research Director. In 1988 he founded the Ben-Gurion University Department of Politics and Government, and served as its first chairperson until 2003. He also founded the BGU Centre for the Study of European Politics and Society (CSEPS) in 2001, later renamed the Simone Veil Research Centre for Contemporary European Society and Politics.

From 2010 to 2016, Newman was elected to serve two consecutive terms as dean of the Faculty of Humanities and Social Sciences at Ben-Gurion University.

Newman played a leading role in the defence of Israeli universities and the academic community in the face of a proposed academic boycott of Israel during 2006–2008. and has been active in projects that negated the attempts to impose any form of academic boycott on Israeli scholars or institutions.

In 2006, Newman was the Leverhulme Professor in Geopolitics at the University of Bristol in the UK, followed by a year as a visiting professor at the Department of Geography at Queen Mary and Westfield College at the University of London, and more recently at the South Asian University in Delhi, India and King's College London.

Newman was appointed Officer of the Order of the British Empire (OBE) in the 2013 Birthday Honours for services to higher education and the humanities and promoting academic links between the UK and Israel.

In June 2014, Ben Gurion University appointed Newman as the first incumbent of a new University Professorial Chair in Geopolitics.

In 2016, Newman was named as one of the 100 most significant immigrants from the UK to Israel to have had an impact on Israeli society within his professional fields of activity.

Newman wrote or coauthored the following entries in the Encyclopedia Judaica: aliyah, Gush Emunim, State of Israel, and religious peace movements.

== Research focus ==
=== Political geography, geopolitics and borders ===
Newman is associated with a number of border and boundary-related institutions, such as the International Boundaries Research Unit in the UK, the Association of Borderland Studies in the USA, the Border Regions in Transition (BRIT) network, and, until 2012, as the secretary of the Commission on the World Political Map (WPM) of the International Geographical Union.

Newman has facilitated and attended as a keynote speaker at international gatherings dealing with geopolitical and border-related issues. Newman has spent time as a visiting professor and research fellow at several universities and research institutions throughout Europe and North America. From 1993 to 1995, Newman was an Israel-Canada visiting professor at the universities of Calgary and York, Toronto.

Newman played a leading role in the relegitimization of Geopolitics and Political Geography as a sub-discipline of both Geography and International relations, following almost four decades in which the topic had been left out of university research and teaching curricula due to its past associations with the Geopolitik of the Third Reich.

From 1999–2014 Newman served as chief editor, together with Professor John Agnew from UCLA and then with Prof Simon Dalby from the University of Waterloo in Canada, of the International journal Geopolitics, published quarterly by Taylor and Francis (Routledge).

In June 2014, Ben Gurion University appointed Newman as the first incumbent of a new University Professorial Chair in Geopolitics. a position he held until his formal retirement from Ben-Gurion University in September 2024.

Within the broader field of Geopolitics, Newman’s work has focused on the changing functions and roles of borders within the international and national systems. Leading on from a seminal paper published in 1998, together with Professor Anssi Paasi from the University of Oulu in Finland. Newman has discussed and challenged such concepts as “borderless” and “deterritorialized” worlds, arguing that borders have never disappeared, even when they have opened to more significant movement and elasticity, but have changed their functions in response to changing global and political realities. Following the events of 9/11, Newman and his colleagues have observed and analyzed the ways in which many borders have become reconstituted in the name of national securitization, including the construction of many new walls and fences throughout the world.

From 2012–2016, Newman was part of a 20-university pan-European consortium of the FP7 (EU) funded project on Borderscapes, headed up by the University of Joensuu in Finland. In 2013, Newman and Ben-Gurion University became part of the new borders project, Borders in Globalization, funded by the Canadian SSHRC and headed by Prof. Emmanuel Brunet-Jailly at the University of Victoria, Canada.

In 2023, Newman hosted, as part of the activities of the Research Chair in Geopolitics, the third World Conference of the ABS (association for Borderland Studies) conference at the Eilat Campus of Ben-Gurion University, attended by almost 300 leading border scholars and practitioners from throughout the world.

=== Israeli politics and society – the Arab-Israel conflict and settlement landscapes ===
Newman’s Ph.D. from the University of Durham was the first significant analysis of settlements and territorial change in the West Bank post-1967. It focused on the political and planning activities of the Gush Emunim religious nationalist settlement movement, a topic he revisited during the subsequent period and up until now.

His work has also focused on the functioning of Israel’s borders, with a particular focus on the Green Line border, which separates Israel and the West Bank.

Unique in this respect were two joint research projects, with Israeli-Palestinian geographer, Ghazi Falah, looking at the changing political geographical dimensions of the Israel-Palestine conflict. The projects, funded by the Ford Foundation and the John and Catherine Macarthur Foundation in the 1990s, resulted in a series of four co-authored papers in leading academic journals, a form of co-authorship that was in its infancy during this period.

Further research projects in the area of Israel-Arab geopolitics included the United States Institute of Peace (USIP) examining potential cross-border cooperation between Israel and a future Palestinian State and a European Union consortium project looking at the role of the EU in intervening in border conflicts, and a European Union Partnership in Peace program, facilitating peace related workshops for religious teachers in Israel and Palestine in an attempt to promote dialogue and cross-cultural peace-building activities.

Following his work on the political dimensions of West Bank settlement, Newman spent much of the 1980s as a research affiliate at the Settlement Study center, analyzing the new forms of urban communities that were reforming the Israeli settlement landscape and in particular creating a continuum of settlements linking the metropolitan and the urban with the rural, all of which were undergoing change after four decades of statehood. This work, in cooperation with Dr. Leviah Applebaum, resulted in two books, one examining the changing modes of settlement and the second an analysis of the system of rural local government (the Regional Councils). This also resulted in the publication, together with Israeli cartographer Avigdor Orgad, of an Atlas of Regional Councils in 1992.

Within these areas, Newman wrote or coauthored entries in the Encyclopedia Judaica and other Encyclopaedias on topics such as aliyah, Gush Emunim, State of Israel, and religious peace movements.

=== The history of the Jewish community in the United Kingdom in the 19th and 20th centuries ===
In the latter part of his career, Newman developed a secondary research interest in the history of the Jewish communities throughout the United Kingdom from the mid-19th century until now. In particular, his work has focused on:

- The lost histories and heritages of Synagogues and communities that have closed and/or moved on to greener pastures.
- Rabbinical personalities (many of whom came to the UK from Eastern Europe in the late 19th and early 20th centuries) who shaped the life of the orthodox Jewish communities during this period.
- The artistic heritage of the UK Jewish communities, with a specific focus on the David Hillman stained glass windows, which adorn many of the larger synagogues throughout Greater London and other parts of the world.

== Affiliations and public activities ==
In addition to his academic work, Newman has also been active as a public scholar in both media and politics.

From 1997 to 2003 and again from 2009 until 2016, Newman published a weekly op-ed column in The Jerusalem Post. From 2019 until the present period, Newman publishes occasional op-ed columns and analysis in the Times of Israel. He has published essays and opinion columns in newspapers and magazines, such as The New York Times, The Guardian, and Tikkun Magazine.

His political activities have focused on the Israeli peace camp, arguing for territorial withdrawal and the establishment of a Palestinian state alongside Israel as part of a Two-state solution to the conflict.

Newman was subject to attacks by right-wing organizations in Israel, such as IsraCampus, Academic Monitor, Im Tirzu, and the NGO Monitor, for his founding and leadership of the Department of Politics and Government at the university and for his left of center political positions on the Arab–Israeli conflict. During 2012–2013, Newman was active in defending his university and department against attempts at right-wing political intervention on the part of Israel's Council of Higher Education., including the (unsuccessful) attempt by the then minister of education, Gideon Sa'ar, to close the department.

Since 2000, Newman has been responsible for the transfer of unused Torah scrolls from synagogues in the UK to new young communities in Israel. Where necessary, these scrolls have been repaired by professional scribes in Jerusalem and rededicated in the names of the donor communities Scrolls have been brought from various London communities, Edinburgh, and Bristol to Israeli communities such as Meitar, Yeruham, and Mevo Beitar. This is an ongoing project aimed at preserving Jewish synagogue heritage objects and creating live links between old communities in the UK and new young communities in Israel.

== Selected publications ==
Newman, David. 2003. `On borders and power: A Theoretical Framework', Journal of Borderland Studies, Vol 18 (1), 13-25.

Newman, David. 2006 `Borders and bordering: towards an interdisciplinary dialogue’, European Journal of Social Theory, Vol 9 (2), 171-186.

Newman, David. 2006 `The lines that continue to separate us: Borders in our borderless world’, Progress in Human Geography, Vol 30 (2), 1-19.

Newman, David. 2005. `From “hitnachalut” to “hitnatkut”: The Impact of Gush Emunim and the Settlement Movement on Israeli Society’, Israel Studies, Vol 10 (3), 192-224.

Newman, David, AND PAASI ANSSI 2009 `Fences and neighbours in the post-modern world: boundary narratives in political geography', Progress in Human Geography, 22 (2), 186-207, 1998).

Newman, David. 2011 `Contemporary Research Agendas in Border Studies: An Overview’, In Doris Wastl-Water, Ed. Ashgate Research Companion to Border Studies. Ashgate Publishers. . Chap 2, pp. 33–47.

Newman, David. 2013 `Gush Emunim and the Settler Movement’, In Joel Peters and David Newman (Eds) A Companion to the Israel-Palestine Conflict. Routledge. Chap 22, pp. 255–266.

Newman, David. 2013 `Territory and Borders’ In Joel Peters and David Newman (Eds) A Companion to the Israel-Palestine Conflict. Routledge. Chap 11, pp. 135–144.

Newman, David. 2015 Borders, Boundaries and Borderlands, The Wiley – AAG Encyclopaedia of Geography – Political Geography Subsection. John Wiley.
