= Emmanuel Brunet-Jailly =

Canadian political scientist

Emmanuel Brunet-Jailly (1961) is a Canadian politics and public policy scholar at the University of Victoria, British Columbia, Canada, where he is associate professor, co-director of the Local Government Institute, and director of the European Studies Program. He is editor of the international scholarly publication; Journal of Borderlands Studies (JBS), and executive secretary and treasurer of the international scholarly Association for Borderlands Studies.

== Biography ==
Emmanuel Brunet-Jailly was born in Paris and raised in the South of France. He holds an LLB from Paul Cézanne University, an MA in Political Science from University of Paris 1 Pantheon-Sorbonne, and a Ph.D. from the University of Western Ontario, London, Ontario, Canada. Michael Keating (political scientist) was chair of his Ph.D. committee. In 1999, he was appointed Assistant Director of the Nanovic Institute for European Studies at the University Of Notre Dame, Indiana, USA. He was hired by the University of Victoria School of Public Administration in 2001 and granted academic tenure in 2007. He became co-director of the Local Government Institute in 2001, Executive Secretary and Treasurer of the Association of Borderland Studies in 2005, and Editor of the Journal of Borderland Studies in 2008 (with Martin van der Velde and Henk van Houtum (https://henkvanhoutum.nl/). Since July 2008, he is also director of the University of Victoria European Studies Program, an interdisciplinary teaching and research unit grouping UVic scholars from five of its faculties.

== Research ==
Brunet-Jailly’s published work focuses on two main areas of research:comparative urban governance, and the governance of cross-border regions, with a specific focus on comparative decentralization, horizontal and vertical governance, and the theorization of cross-border regions.

His interest in border cities and border urban regions, originates from his work as a civil servant of the French Government Agence Pour la Création d'Entreprises. While working in the Paris office of APCE he developed a strong interest in what makes cities wealthy or poor, their international relations, and the impact of economic integration on urban politics.

As a result, a first strand of research is his notable attempt to make a strong theoretical contribution to the study of urban borderlands. In the 1990s, this literature was underdeveloped, but has seen a resurgence of interests after the September 11, 2001 attacks on New York and Washington D.C.. One of his goals has been to develop a border model that would allow scholars to compare borders effectively and thus expand the scholarly 'boundaries' of their respective fields of study.

A second concurrent strand of research is about urban governance issues. In this area, he has published a number of research papers and a book Local Government in a Global World at the University of Toronto Press, with John Martin. Since 2001, he has written with Warren Magnusson (University of Victoria) the "Municipal Affairs" section of the Canadian Annual Review of Politics and Policies.

All in all, as of 2008, his short biography states that his research work has appeared or is forthcoming in eight books or guest edited scholarly journals, and over 38 articles and book chapters in the following refereed journals and presses: Canadian American Public Policy, Canadian Political Science Review, Canadian Annual Review of Politics and Public Affairs, Geopolitics, International Journal of Economic Development, Journal of Borderland Studies, Journal of Urban Affairs, University of Toronto Press, University Of Ottawa Press, Institute of Public Administration of Canada , Rowman and Littlefield (Lanham, MD), Commonwealth Local Government Forum (London, UK London), Hassleholm; Sweden, Queen’s McGill University Press, Septentrion University Press, Lille, France, and Katharla publishers, Paris, France.

== Published work ==
Notable publications on border and borderland issues include:

- "The Canadian American Border" guest-editor of a special number of the Journal of Borderland Studies (2004). 19/1.
- "Theorizing Borders: An Interdisciplinary Perspective" Geopolitics (2005) Vol. 10/4.
- "Border Security" guest-editor of a special number of the Journal of Borderland Studies (2006) 21/1.
- "Rarely Studied Borders and Borderlands" equal guest editor with Donald Alper, Journal of Borderland Studies (2008) 23/3.
- "Cascadia – The Emergence of a North American Border Region" special number of the Canadian Political Science Review equal guest editor with Patrick Smith. (2007) 2/1
- Borderlands – Comparing Border Security in North America and Europe editor (2007) University of Ottawa Press. This book won the Silver Book Award of the Association of Borderland Studies in 2008. See a review of Borderland, by past Canada NAFTA Transportation Committee Chair Brian Fleming.
- These theoretical contributions suggest a model of analysis of borders that resists a one-dimensional analysis, and argues that, in the cases of borders and borderlands, agency and structure are intermeshed.

Other publications on border and borderland issues include:

- "Leader Survey on Canada-US Cross-Border Regions," by Emmanuel Brunet-Jailly, University of Victoria, Susan E. Clarke, University of Colorado, Debora L. VanNijnatten, Wilfrid Laurier University, Derek Jansen, EKOS Research Associates Inc., Christian Boucher, Policy Research Initiative, and André Downs, The Canadian Government Policy Research Initiative project on North American Linkages, Policy Research Initiative #WP012, February 2006. [North American Linkages]

- "The Emergence of CBRs along the Mexican-US Border and in Europe," by Emmanuel Brunet-Jailly, University of Victoria, Tony Payan, University of Texas at El Paso, and Gary Sawchuk, The Canadian Government Policy Research Initiative project on North American Linkages, Policy Research Initiative #WP035, February 2008. [Cross Border Regions]
- Comparing Local Cross-Border Relations Under the EU and NAFTA, (2004) Canadian American Public Policy, University of Maine, Orono.
- "Frontières nord-américaines et frontières européennes : le Canada peut-il tirer des leçons de l’Europe?" LE MULTILATERAL (2007)

His work on urban regions includes:

- Local Government in a Global World – Australia and Canada in Comparative Perspectives equal guest editor (with John Martin, La Trobe University, Australia). University of Toronto Press. (2010) see also.
- Vancouver: the sustainable city (2008) Journal of Urban Affairs, 30/2.
- "France Between Decentralization and Multilevel Governance: Central Municipal Relations in France" in Harvey Lazard and Christian Leupretch. (2007). Sphere of Governance, Comparative Studies of Cities in Multilevel Governance Systems, Queen’s McGill University Press." This book was reviewed by Michael Pagano for Publius:
- From Measuring to Managing Performance: Recent Trends in the Development of Municipal Public Sector Accountability (2005) (with Carol Agocs, Thomas Plant and Janine Douglas), Institute of Public Administration Canada.

Canadian Annual Review of Politics and Public Affairs. since 2001, (with Warren Magnusson, University of Victoria) yearly contribution on Urban affairs in Canada, University of Toronto Press.

== Lectures, talks & keynote addresses ==
Brunet-Jailly has lectured at North American, European and Chinese Universities, including: the Universities of Victoria; Western Ontario, Canada, where he has been teaching in the DPA/MPA program since 1999; University of Alberta (Edmonton, AB); University of Saskatchewan; Notre Dame University (IN- USA); Jerusalem (Israel); Geneva (Switzerland); Luxembourg; Radboud University, Nijmegen (NL); FuCAm, Mons (Belgium); Sonderborg, DK; Lund (Sweden); University of Iceland, Iceland; Hong Kong University, Hong Kong; University of Xiamen, Xiamen, China; University of Grenoble 1, France; and University of Lille, France, where he has been invited yearly to lecture since 2005.

Brunet-Jailly has also been invited to give talks and keynote addresses on borderlands, borderland theory, border security or the governance of large urban regions and world cities. For instance, he gave the concluding remarks at the Border Region In Transition Jerusalem conference (BRIT 8), and the academic inaugural keynote address at the Managing World Cities conference along with Newman, Savitch and Tsukamoto.

== Editorial ==
Brunet-Jailly is on the editorial board of Environnement Urbain/Urban Environment, Montreal, Quebec based journal of urban research .

== Other honors ==
He chaired the Urban Section of the Canadian Political Science Association meeting 2004.

- Don Alper and Brunet-Jailly co-organized the 2009 BRIT meeting in Victoria, BC and Bellingham, WA. Over 150 scholars and policy makers met to discuss border security issues.
- Brunet-Jailly is the 2009–2010 President of the European Community Studies Association - Canada, and president of the ECSA-C conference 2010.
