= Gerald Blake (academic) =

British geographer

Gerald Henry Blake is a retired British academic and geographer. He is Professor Emeritus of Geography at Durham University. He was Principal of Collingwood College, Durham from 1987 to 2001.

He attended Monkton Combe School from 1949 to 1954. A former student of St Edmund Hall, Oxford, Blake was appointed Professor of Geography in 1995.

== Publications ==
- Alasdair Drysdale and Gerald Blake (1985). The Middle East and North Africa: A Political Geography. New York: Oxford University Press. ISBN 0195035380.
