= Great Mosque of Maarat al-Numan =

Mosque in Maarat al-Numan, Syria

- جَامِع مَعَرَّة ٱلنُّعْمَان ٱلْكَبِير
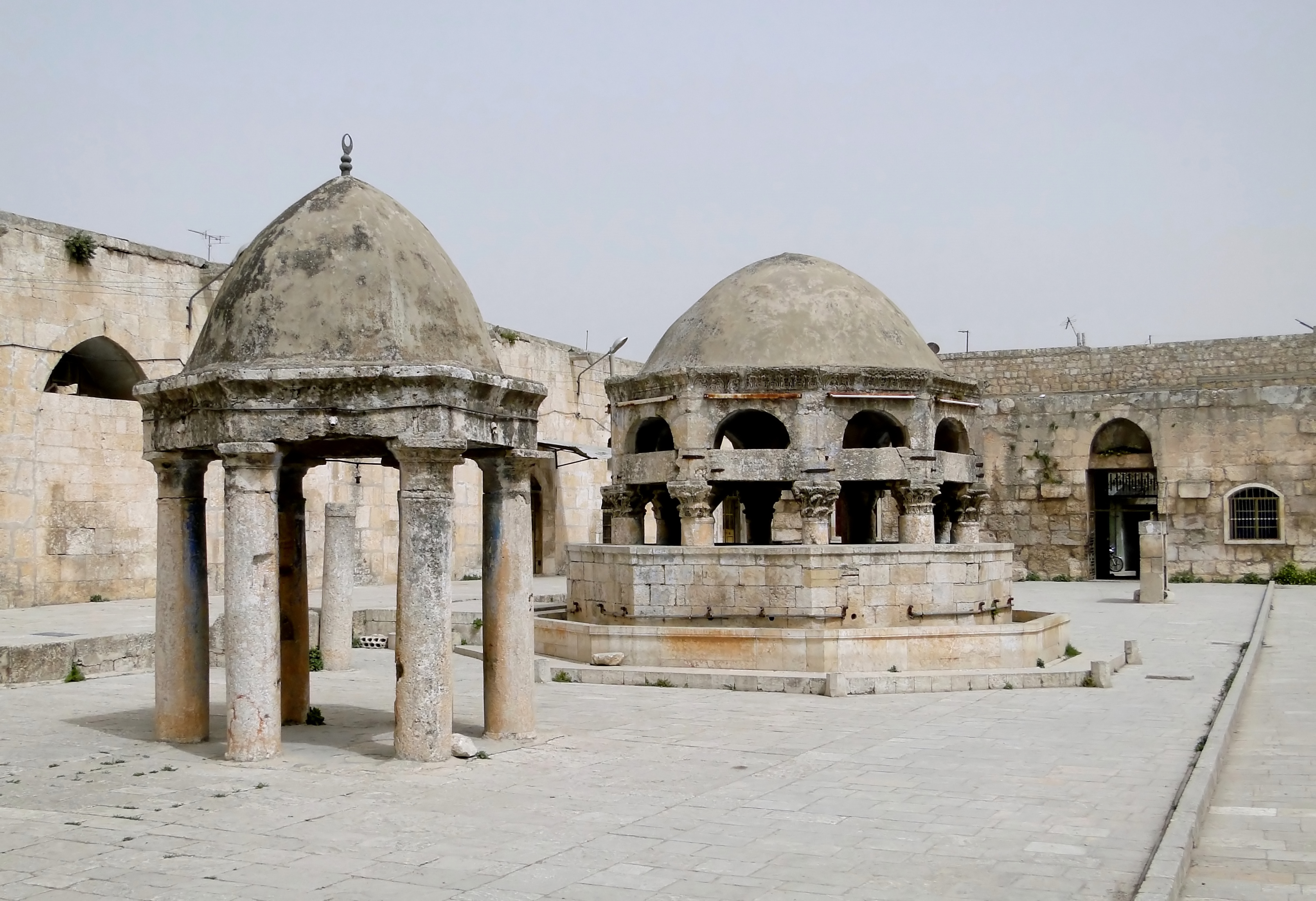
- The ablution area of the former mosque in 2010

- Location of the former mosque in Syria

Religion
- Affiliation: Islam (former)
- Ecclesiastical or organisational status: Mosque (12th century–c. 2016)
- Status: Inactive (ruinous state)

Location
- Location: Maarat al-Numan, Idlib Governorate
- Country: Syria
- Interactive map of Great Mosque of Maarat al-Numan
- Coordinates: 35°38′59″N 36°40′40″E

Architecture
- Architect: Hassan Ben Mukri al-Sarman
- Type: Islamic architecture
- Style: Ayyubid
- Completed: 12th century CE
- Destroyed: c. 2016
- Minaret: 1

The Great Mosque of Maarat al-Numan (Arabic: جَامِع مَعَرَّة ٱلنُّعْمَان ٱلْكَبِير, romanized: Jāmiʿ Maʿarrat an-Nuʿmān al-Kabīr) is a 12th-century Ayyubid-era mosque in the city of Maarat al-Numan, located between Hama and Aleppo in Syria.

== Architecture ==
Rebuilt in the first half of the twelfth century, the mosque is located on the site of an earlier church and, before that, likely a pagan temple. The mosque is centered on a large rectangular sahn with a long, shallow prayer hall with six domes that cover the central bays before the mihrab. The architectural features are reminiscent of the layout of the Umayyad Mosque in Damascus. A water tank covered by a canopy resting on ten columns with antique Corinthian capitals stood at the centre of the sahn.

The mosque's square minaret is similar to the former minaret of the Great Mosque of Aleppo. An inscription on the minaret attributes the work to Qahir ibn 'Ali ibn Qanit (d. 1199 CE).

== Destruction ==
In June 2016 air-raids targeting the Idlib Governorate caused severe structural damage to the mosque. Several stone archways collapsed, and wall surfaces were marred by shrapnel. Additionally, a modern metal awning, added to provide shade in the courtyard, was destroyed. While the mosque has suffered damage from previous bombings, this was the first time that it was directly hit.

== Gallery ==
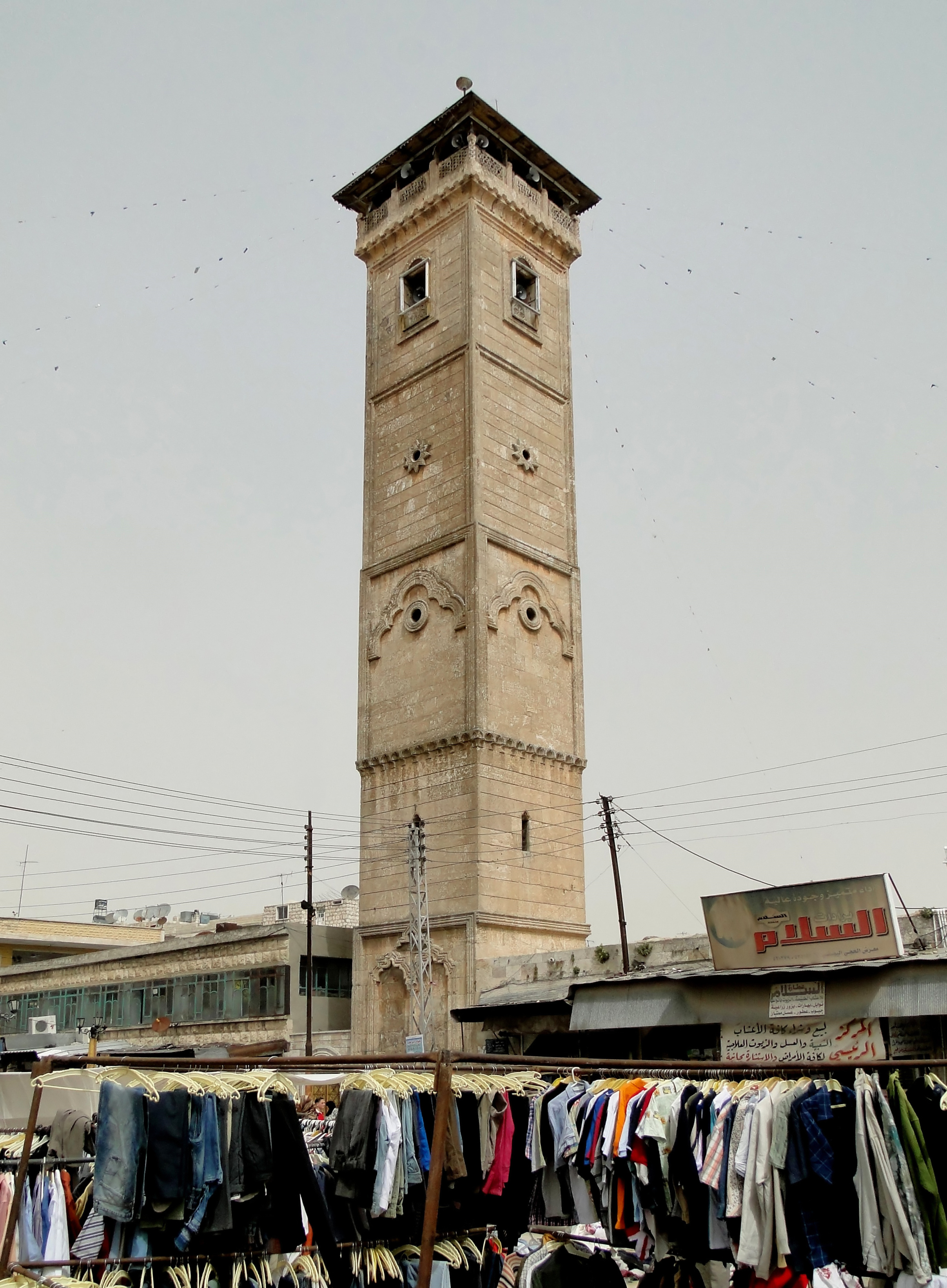
Minaret of the former mosque, in 2010

== See also ==
- Islam in Syria
- List of mosques in Syria
- High medieval domes
- Chahartaq (architecture)
