= Funk & Wagnalls New Encyclopedia =

General-knowledge encyclopaedia

Funk & Wagnalls New Encyclopedia is an English-language encyclopedia published by Funk & Wagnalls. Originally titled the Funk & Wagnalls Standard Encyclopedia upon its release in 1912, it adopted its new name in 1971.

It is not as scholarly or comprehensive as the major encyclopedias, but it presents information in a straightforward manner and covers all fields of knowledge.

The Funk & Wagnalls New Encyclopedia served as the basis for the Encarta encyclopedia.
