= Dennis Rumley =

- Scientific career
- Fields: Political geography, Indian Ocean Studies
- Institutions: Curtin University
- Doctoral students: Viv Forbes, Oren Yiftachel

Dennis Rumley is a political geographer from the ‘Newcastle School’ and a "long time specialist of the Indian Ocean Region and now of the Indo-Pacific Region". He is Emeritus Professor at Curtin University.

== Career ==
Rumley was the founding editor of the Journal of the Indian Ocean Region, and remains on the journal's editorial board. as well as being outgoing Foundation Chair of the Indian Ocean Research Group (IORG). He has taught and researched at the University of Western Australia, the University of Tokyo, Kyoto University and more recently at Curtin University where he was Professor of Indian Ocean Studies.

Dennis Rumley has also had a strong association with the regional peak body – the Indian Ocean Rim Association (IORA). For example, he was appointed as Australia’s focal point to the Indian Ocean Rim Academic Group (IORAG) in December 2010 and became Vice-Chair of the IORAG at the IOR-ARC meeting in Bangalore in November 2011 for a period of two years.

Rumley has successfully supervised many Ph D students, many of whom have gone on to success in the public and private sector, and some (for example Viv Forbes and Oren Yiftachel) have achieved considerable international academic success in their respective fields.

== Publications ==
His book The Rise and Return of the Indo-Pacific (co-authored with Timothy Doyle) was published by Oxford University Press in 2020. It has been described as a "very welcomed and insightful critical analysis of the Indo-Pacific", and praised for the authors' "vast experience on the Indian Ocean and Asia- Pacific geopolitics" which a reviewer stated "has been mobilized to provide a comprehensive and well-articulated portrait of what is behind the concept of the Indo-Pacific and to make interesting proposals regarding the prospect of the future development of a formal Indo-Pacific regionalism". Another reviewer calls the book "a highly successful attempt to distill the essence of past and present cultural narratives, geopolitical concepts, and the role of various states and actors of a “region” (broadly speaking)". Rumley sees the Indo-Pacific as becoming increasingly important in global politics due to the "shift to a new bipolar world — [dominated by] the US and China".
