= Iranians in Syria =

Total population
- 1,600

Regions with significant populations
- Damascus, Aleppo

Languages
- Persian and Arabic

Religion
- Predominantly Islam, minority Christianity

Related ethnic groups
- Iranians, Arabs, Azeris, Armenians, Kurds, Lebanese, Turks

Iranians in Syria are residents of Iranian background or descent residing in Syria. Some of them are Syrian citizens while some are migrants or descendants born in Syria with Iranian ancestry. Many Iranians in Syria live in Damascus.

== See also ==
- Iran–Syria relations
- Iranian diaspora
- Iranian support for Syria in the Syrian Civil War
