= Nikolaos van Dam =

Dutch scholar and author

- Born: 1 April 1945 (age 81); Amsterdam, Netherlands
- Education: University of Amsterdam (MA, PhD)
- Occupations: Diplomat and author
- Spouse: Marinka van Dam-Bogaerts
- Children: 4
- Writing career
- Language: Arabic, Dutch, and English
- Notable works: The struggle for power in Syria: sectarianism, regionalism and tribalism in politics, 1961–1994
- Notable awards: Grand Officer of the Order of Merit of the Grand Duchy of Luxembourg; Knight Commander’s Cross of the Order of Merit of the Federal Republic of Germany

Nikolaos (Koos) van Dam (born 1 April 1945) is a Dutch scholar and author on the Middle East. He also was a Dutch Ambassador to Iraq, Egypt, Germany and Indonesia.

== Education and career ==
Van Dam studied Arabic language and Islam, as well as political and social sciences, in which he received a M.A. degree (doctorandus) cum laude from the University of Amsterdam in 1973. He subsequently obtained a Ph.D. degree in Literature at the same university in 1977. He taught Modern Middle Eastern History at the University of Amsterdam (1970–75), was First Secretary at the Netherlands Embassy in Beirut, covering Lebanon, Jordan and Cyprus (1980–83), Chargé d'Affaires of the Netherlands in Tripoli, Libya (1983–85), and Deputy Director for African and Middle Eastern Affairs at the Netherlands Ministry of Foreign Affairs (1985–88). He was also Ambassador of the Netherlands in Baghdad, Iraq (1988–91; accredited until 2004), in Cairo, covering Egypt and Palestinian occupied territories (1991–96), in Ankara, covering Turkey and Azerbaijan (1996–99), in Bonn & Berlin, Germany (1999–2005), and in Jakarta (2005-2010), covering Indonesia and Timor-Leste.

== Author ==
He is the author of The struggle for power in Syria: sectarianism, regionalism, and tribalism in politics, 1961–1978, الصراع على السلطة فى سوريا: الطائفية واﻹقليمية والعشائرية فى السياسة – الطبعة الإلكترونية, Taylor & Francis, 1979, ISBN 0-85664-703-9, and the subsequent The struggle for power in Syria: sectarianism, regionalism and tribalism in politics, 1961–1994, 1995.

== Honours ==
- Order of Orange Nassau (Netherlands)
  - Officer (1991)
  - Knight (1983)
- Knight Commander's Cross of the Order of Merit of the Federal Republic of Germany (2005)
- Grand Officer of the Order of Merit of the Grand Duchy of Luxembourg (2003)
