= Umayyad Mosque of Baalbek =

Mosque in Baalbek, Lebanon

Coordinates: 34.0071°N 36.2073°E

- (الجامع الأموي الكبير في بعلبك)
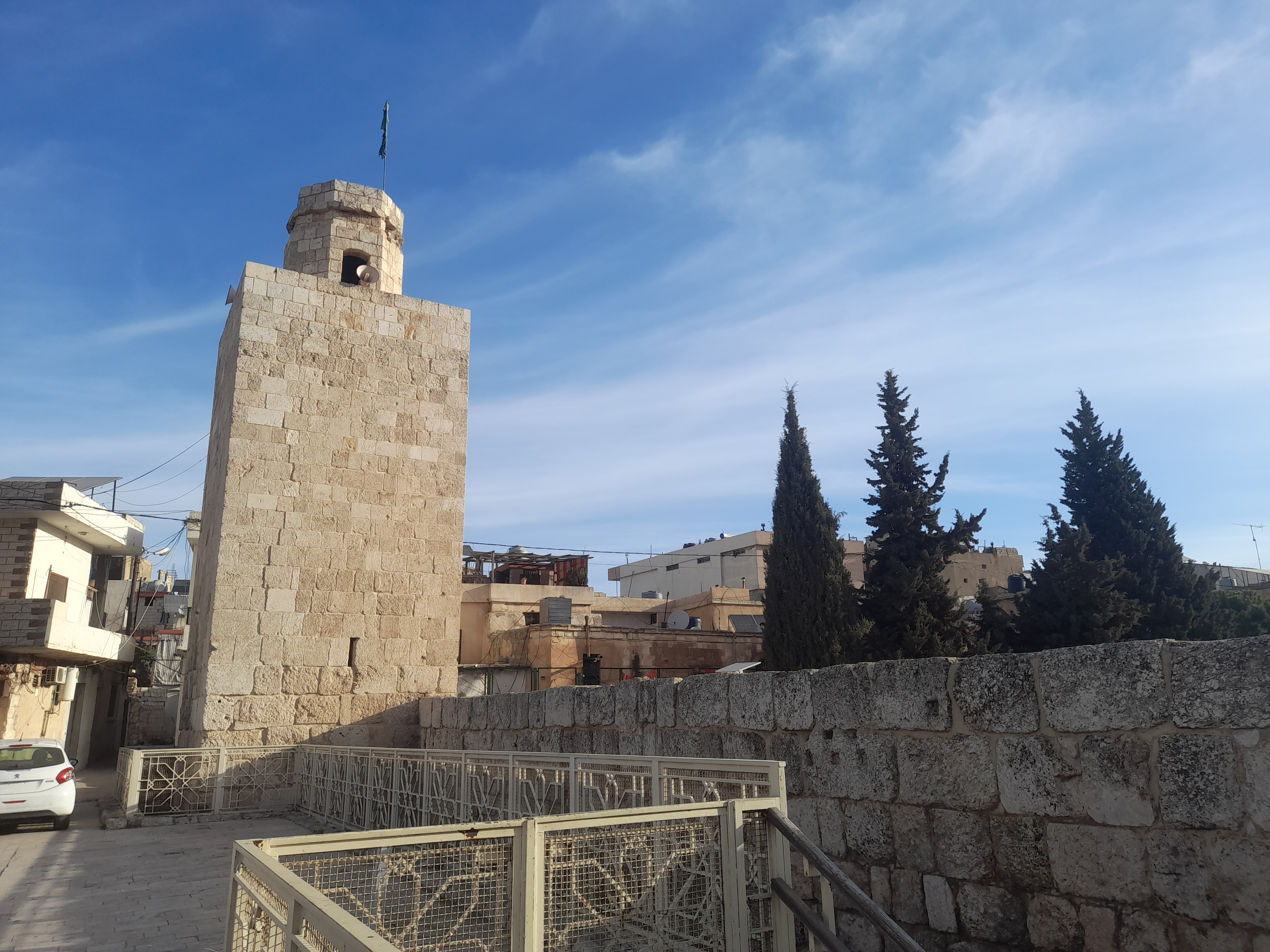
- view of the mosque's minaret

Religion
- Affiliation: Sunni Islam
- Ecclesiastical or organizational status: Masjid
- Status: Active

Location
- Location: 2644, Baalbek, Beqaa Valley, Baalbek-Hermel Governorate, Lebanon
- Country: Lebanon
- Interactive map of Umayyad Mosque of Baalbek

Architecture
- Type: Mosque
- Style: Umayyad
- Founder: Al-Walid I
- Established: 715; 1311 years ago CE (96 AH)

Specifications
- Dome: None
- Minaret: 1

The Umayyad Mosque of Baalbek or the Great Mosque of Baalbek is located near the Roman ruins of Baalbek, Lebanon in the Beqaa Valley. It was built in the late first century AH, around 714-5 (96 AH), by Caliph Al-Walid ibn Abd al-Malik. It is one of the oldest and largest mosques in the city of Baalbek. It combines both Byzantine and early Arab Islamic architecture. As with the other Umayyad monuments, the site of this mosque was carefully chosen by the Umayyads. It is located near the Roman ruins of Baalbek where the Roman temple of Jupiter is located. It is said that Saladin has studied in this mosque.

== Construction style ==
Stones from the Baalbek Roman ruins and quarries were added to this mosque. This mosque bears a striking resemblance to the Umayyad Mosque in Damascus and the Umayyad (Great) Mosque in Aleppo. These three mosques were built during this period, and therefore their designs are somewhat similar. In addition, the architecture of this mosque dates back to the Umayyad era, during the reigns of Al-Walid I and Abd al-Malik, and it is considered a magnificent masterpiece of ancient Islamic art.

In the courtyard stands the square minaret of the mosque, whose unique design resembles a war tower. It was built with large stones to blend in with the rest of the building. Outside the mosque is a spacious courtyard with arcades, surrounded by columns, and containing a small fountain. The mosque is said to be built using columns of various sizes that were taken from the ruins.

== Destruction and restoration ==
It may have been repaired by Nur al-Din, after the earthquake of 1158, which wreaked great havoc in Baalbek, and then under the Ayyubids and the Mamluks, according to some inscriptions engraved on its walls. Most of these texts are administrative decrees, unrelated to the history of the building; they at least prove that the great Mosque remained prosperous until the end of the Mamluk dynasty. In 1318, it was seriously compromised by a flood.

Arabic inscription in the large mosque, indicates that a wall and some windows were rebuilt by the emir Nejmeddin Hassan, the governor of Baalbek and of its fortress, during the reign of the Memluk Sultan Qalawun, in the year 682 AH (1283 AD)

It was destroyed by the great flood that struck the city of Baalbek on Tuesday, May 10, 1318 AD. The flood destroyed more than 1,500 homes, and the water entered the mosque, destroying some of its walls, bringing down the pulpit, and reaching the tops of the columns. The flood was unprecedented, and the water even entered the mosque, where Sheikh Ali bin Muhammad Ali al-Hariri and a group of people were found drowned. This mosque was neglected over the years until it was called "the ruined mosque".

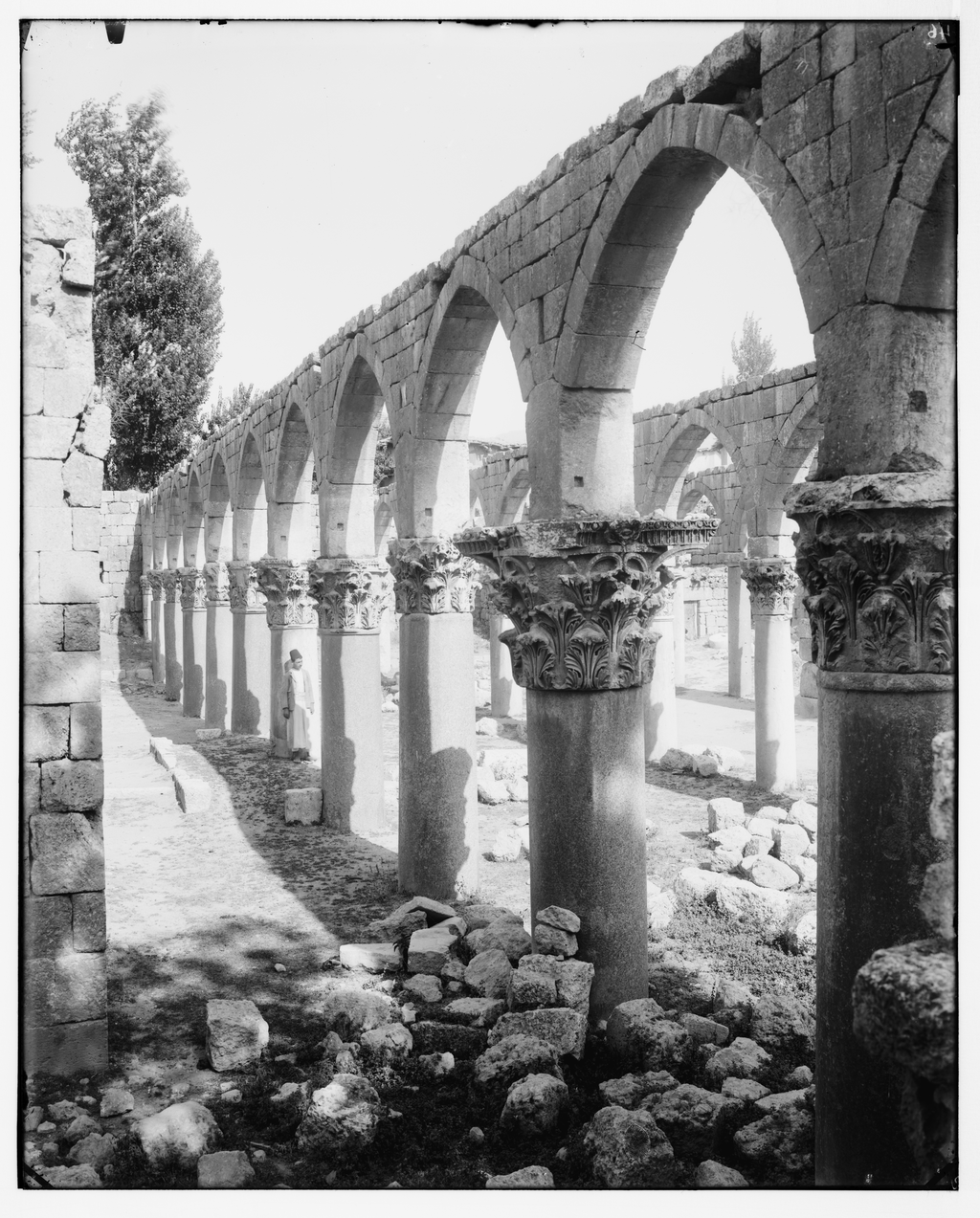
The ruins of the mosque prior to its reconstruction c. 1900

=== Restoration ===
In 1996 it was agreed to rebuild the mosque and it was restored by the Director of the Center for the Revival of Islamic Architectural Heritage, former Dean of the Faculty of Architecture at Beirut Arab University, and an advisor in Hariri Heritage Foundation, Dr. Saleh Lamei Mostafa, and his entire team, from 1996 to 1998, with the support of former prime minister of Lebanon Rafic al-Hariri.

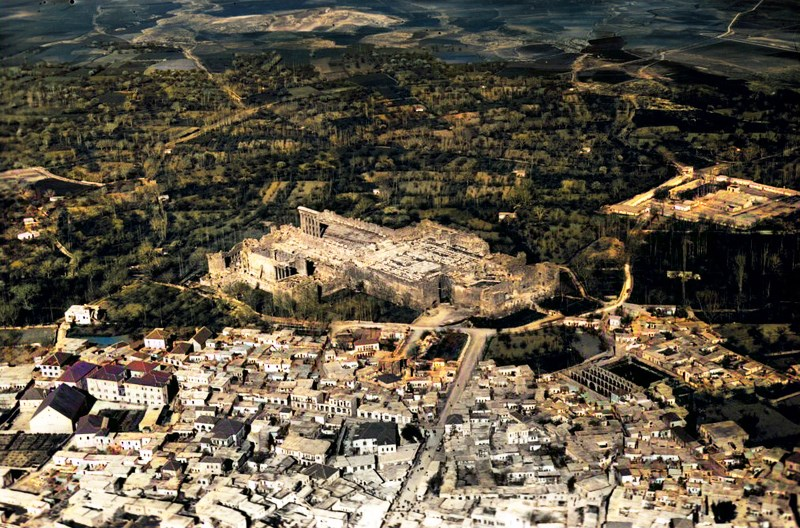
a photo of Baalbek taken in the 1960s with the mosque's columns visible in the right corner opposite of the Roman ruins

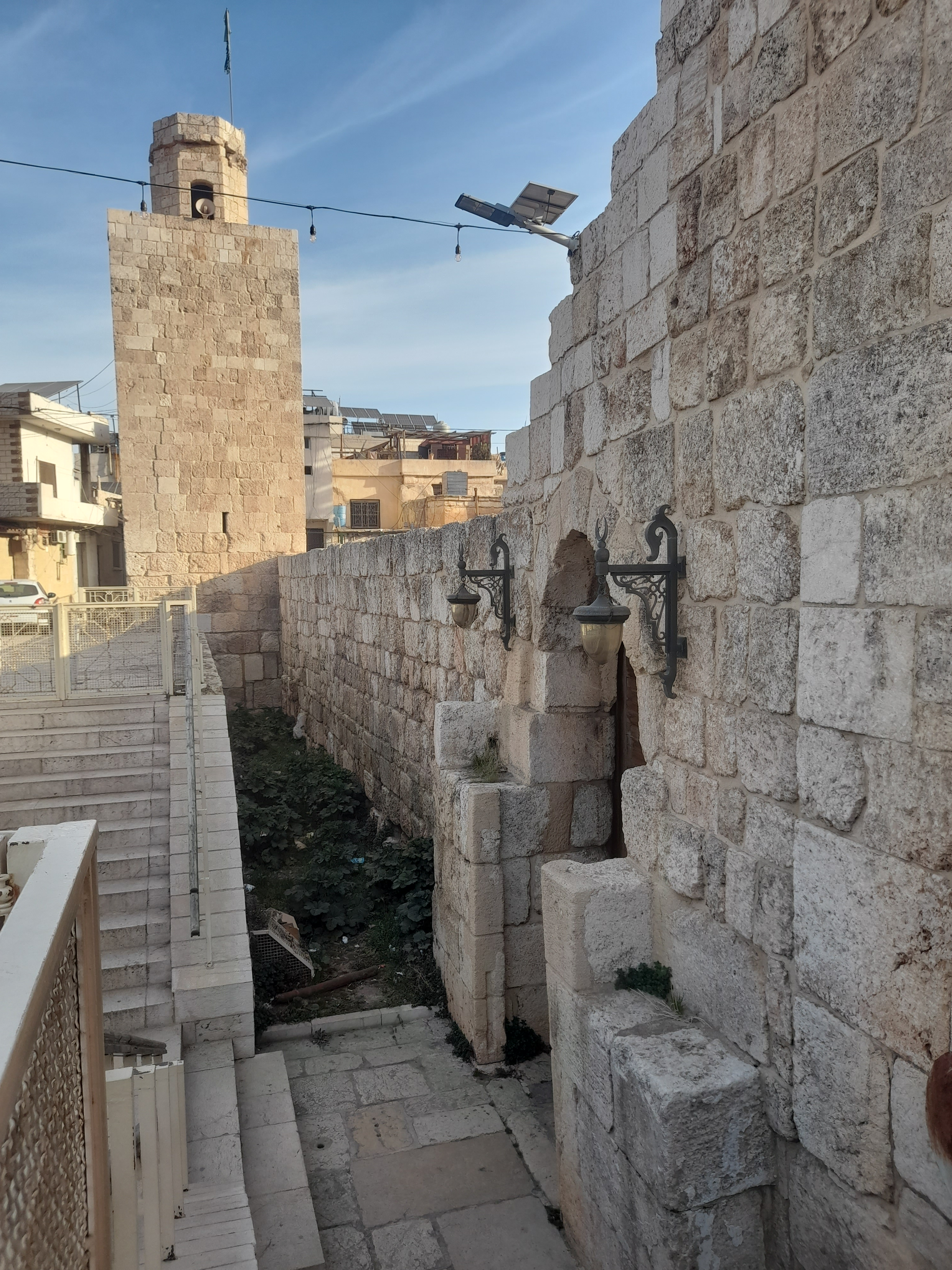
Entrance of the mosque and its minaret

== See also ==
- Umayyad Mosque (of Damascus)
- Umayyad Mosque of Aleppo
