= Great Mosque of Aleppo =

Mosque in Aleppo, Syria

- جَامِع حَلَب ٱلْكَبِيْر
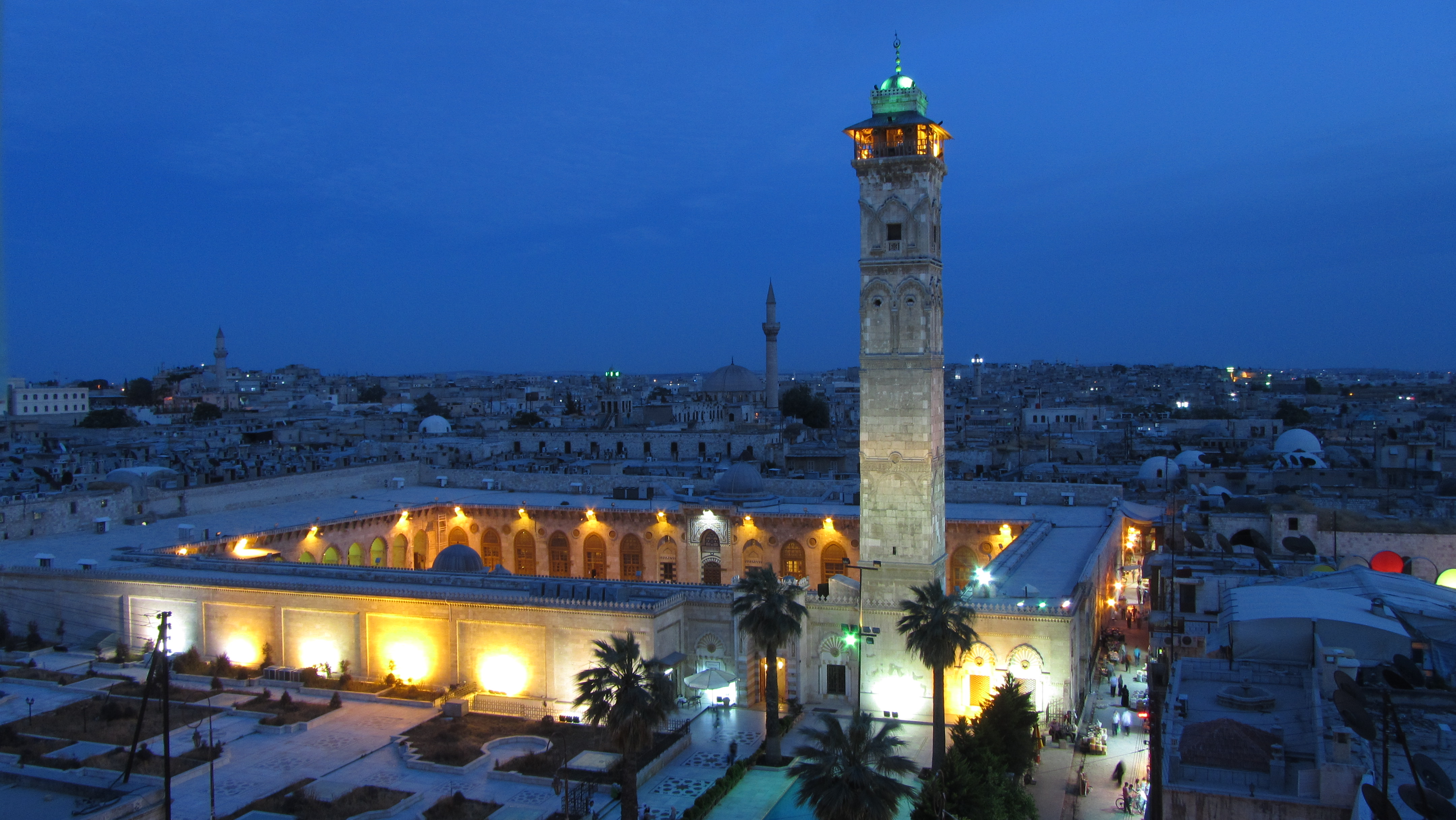
- View of the mosque in 2012, prior to its 2013 partial destruction

Religion
- Affiliation: Islam
- Status: Active

Location
- Location: Al-Jalloum district, Aleppo
- Country: Syria
- Interactive map of Great Mosque of Aleppo
- Coordinates: 36°11′58.17″N 37°9′24.88″E

Architecture
- Architect: Hasan ibn Mufarraj al-Sarmini
- Type: Mosque
- Style: Umayyad (Islamic)
- Completed: 715 CE; 13th century CE (current)

Specifications
- Dome: 1
- Minaret: 1
- Materials: Stone

UNESCO World Heritage Site
- Official name: Ancient City of Aleppo
- Location: Aleppo, Syria
- Includes: Citadel of Aleppo, Al-Madina Souq
- Criteria: Cultural: (iii), (iv)
- Reference: 21
- Inscription: 1986 (10th Session)
- Endangered: 2013–2020
- Area: 364 ha (1.41 sq mi)

The Great Mosque of Aleppo (Arabic: جَامِع حَلَب ٱلْكَبِيْر, romanized: Jāmiʿ Ḥalab al-Kabīr), also known as the Great Umayyad Mosque of Aleppo (Arabic: ٱلْجَامِع ٱلْأُمَوِي ٱلْكَبِيْر فِي حَلَب, romanized: Al-Jāmiʿ al-Umawī al-Kabīr fī Ḥalab), is the largest and one of the oldest mosques in the city of Aleppo, Syria, first built under the Umayyad Caliphate. The mosque is located in the al-Jalloum district of the Ancient City of Aleppo, a World Heritage Site, near the entrance to al-Madina Souq. The mosque was purportedly home to the remains of Zechariah, the father of John the Baptist. It was built in the beginning of the 8th century CE during the reign of the Umayyad caliph Sulayman (r. 715–717), but the current building dates from the 11th through 14th centuries.

The minaret in the mosque, built in 1090, was destroyed during fighting in the Syrian civil war in April 2013. Between 2012 and 2016, the structure of the mosque sustained significant damage, including the collapse of parts of its walls, the burning of its prayer hall, and the loss of priceless historical artefacts. Work commenced in c. 2017 to restore the mosque and its minaret to its original 11th-century style. The mosque was reopened for the month of Ramadan only in March 2025; and was fully reopened in October 2026 after 13 years of closure.

== History ==
=== Founding ===
The site of the Great Mosque was once the agora of the Hellenistic period, which later became the garden for the Cathedral of Saint Helena during the Christian era of Roman rule in Syria.

The mosque was built on land that was formerly used as the Cathedral cemetery. The church itself was left and the area became a sacred place for both religions. According to the later traditions, the construction of the earliest mosque on the site was commenced by the Umayyad caliph al-Walid I in 715 and was finished by his successor Sulayman ibn Abd al-Malik in 717. Architectural historian K. A. C. Creswell has attributed its construction solely to the latter, quoting 13th century Aleppine historian Ibn al-Adim who wrote Sulayman's intent was "to make it equal to the work of his brother al-Walid in the Great Mosque at Damascus". Another tradition claims al-Walid founded the mosque using materials from the so-called "Church of Cyrrus".

However, architectural historian Jere L. Bacharach noted that the most likely patron of the mosque was Maslama ibn Abd al-Malik, a brother of al-Walid and Sulayman who was the governor of the local province (Jund Qinnasrin) sometime prior to 710 until at least the early period of Sulayman's rule. Accordingly, this would explain the belief that the mosque's construction took place during the reign of both caliphs. Moreover, Maslamah's governorship of Qinnasrin was largely ignored by the early Arabic historians, who focused their attention on his campaigns against the Byzantine Empire and the Armenians, and his governorship over the provinces of Iraq, Iranian Azerbaijan, Upper Mesopotamia and Armenia. Bacharach further states that Maslamah's commissioning of a large congregational mosque in Aleppo, a major base from which to attack the Byzantines, would have "been appropriate, if not necessary".

=== Renovation ===
In the second half of the 11th century, the Mirdasids controlled Aleppo and built a single-domed fountain in the mosque's courtyard. At the northwest corner of the mosque, the 45-meter high minaret was built by the Shi'a Muslim qadi (Islamic chief judge) of Aleppo, Abu'l Hasan Muhammad in 1090, during the reign of Seljuk governor Aq Sunqur al-Hajib. Its construction was finished in 1094 during Tutush's rule. The architect of the project was Hasan ibn Mufarraj al-Sarmini.

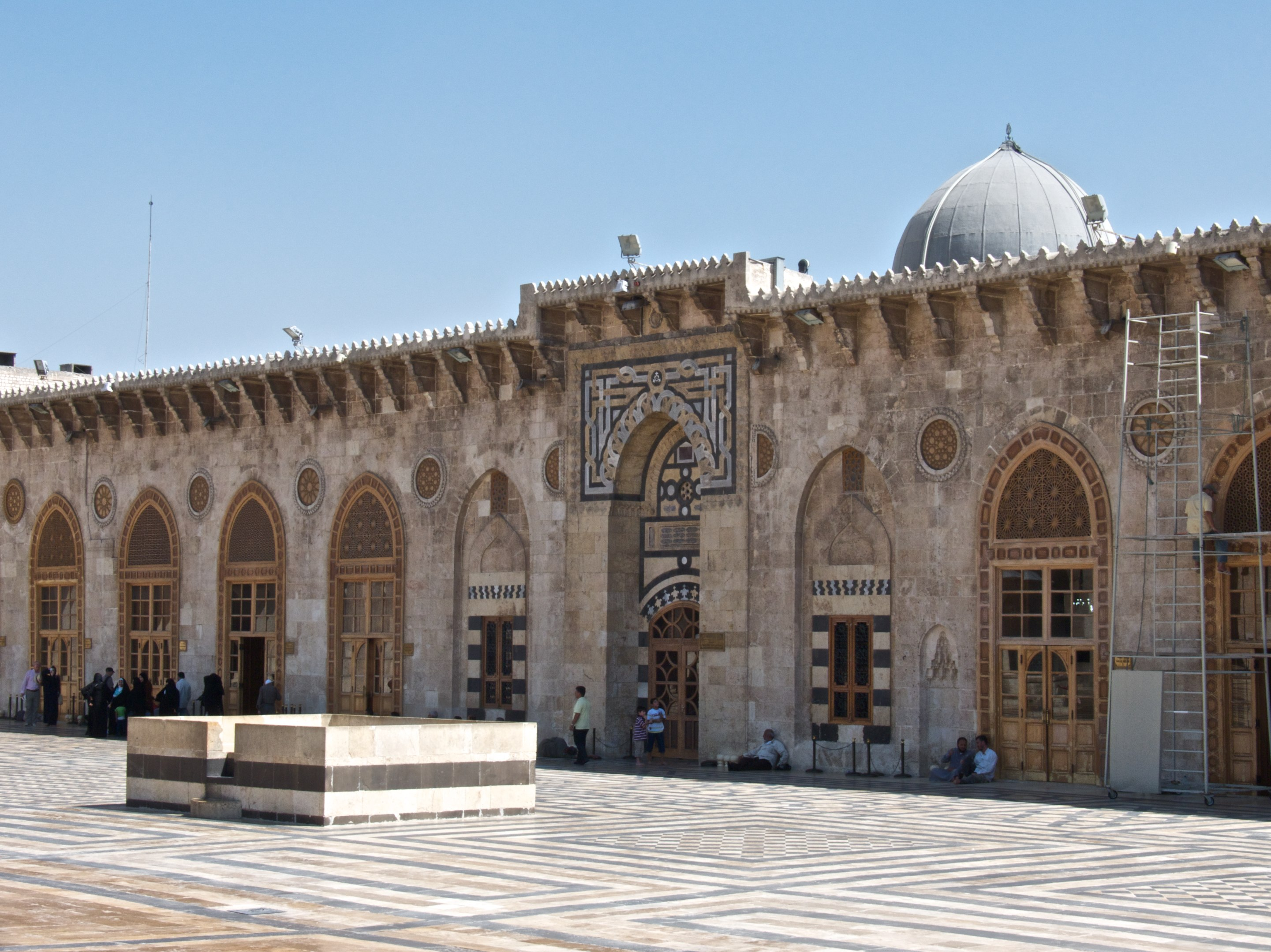
Internal facade from the courtyard (2009)

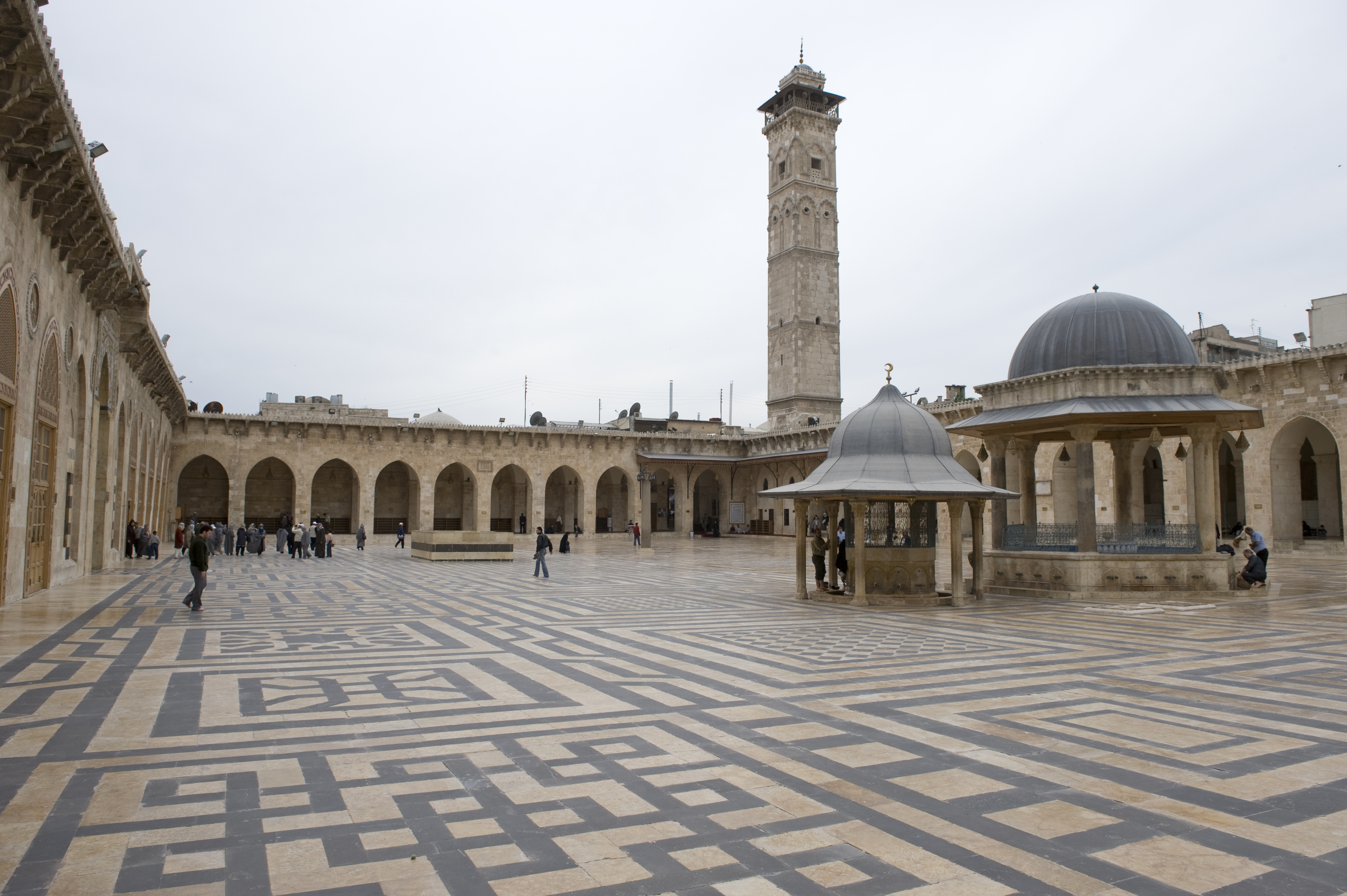
Couryard of the mosque (2009)

The mosque was restored and expanded by the Zengid sultan Nur al-Din in 1159 after a great fire that had destroyed the earlier Umayyad structure; In 1260, the mosque was razed by the Mongols. In 1281, the mosque was burned again by the Mongols, and the minbar ("preacher's pulpit") was taken by the Armenians of Sis, according to al-Mufaddal.

The Mamluks (1260–1516) made repairs and alterations. Carved Kufic and naskhi inscriptions decorated the entire minaret along with alternate bands of stylized ornaments in patterns and muqarnas. Sultan Qalawun replaced the burnt out mihrab (niche indicating the qibla, or direction to Mecca) in 1285. Later, Sultan al-Nasir Muhammad (1293–1341) had the new minbar constructed during his reign.

The courtyard and minaret of the mosque were renovated in 2003.

=== Syrian Civil War ===
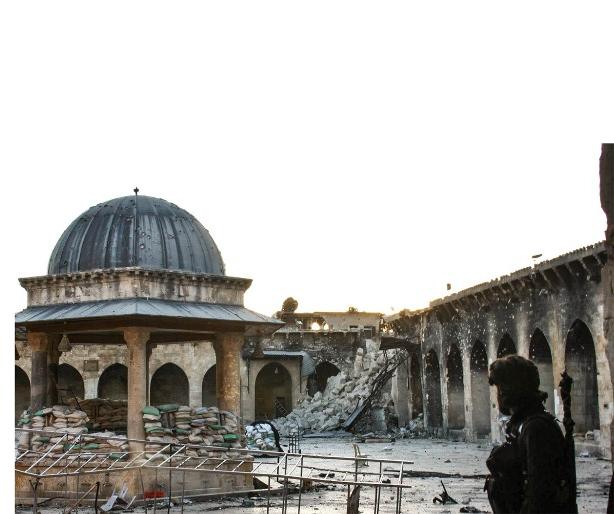
Mosque in 2013, after the destruction of the minaret

On 13 October 2012 the mosque was seriously damaged during clashes between the armed groups of the Free Syrian Army and the Syrian Army forces. President Bashar al-Assad issued a presidential decree to form a committee to repair the mosque by the end of 2013.

The mosque was seized by rebel forces in early 2013, and, as of April 2013, was within an area of heavy fighting, with government forces stationed 200 meters (660 ft) away.

On the 24th of April, 2013, the minaret of the mosque was reduced to rubble during an exchange of heavy weapons fire between government forces and rebels during the Syrian civil war. The Syrian Arab News Agency (SANA) reported that members of Jabhat al-Nusra detonated explosives inside the minaret, while opposition activists said that the minaret was destroyed by Syrian Army tank fire as part of an offensive. Countering assertions by the state media of Jabhat al-Nusra's involvement, opposition sources described them as rebels from the Tawhid Brigades who were fighting government forces around the mosque. The opposition's main political bloc, the Syrian National Coalition (SNC), condemned the minaret's destruction, calling it "an indelible disgrace" and "a crime against human civilization". Syrians have begun rebuilding and restoring the site, with some meager international assistance.

=== Post-war renovation ===
Restoration efforts were launched by the Syrian government in 2017. The mosque was partially reopened during Ramadan in March 2025.

Restoration work was resumed by the Aleppo Endowments Directorate in November 2025, as part of a large-scale project to rehabilitate heritage sites damaged during the Syrian civil war. The mosque was finally reopened on 8 October 2026, following more than 13 years of closure. The reopening ceremony took place in the presence of Aleppo Governor Azzam al-Gharib and Minister of Endowments Mohammad Abu al-Khair Shukri.

== Architecture ==
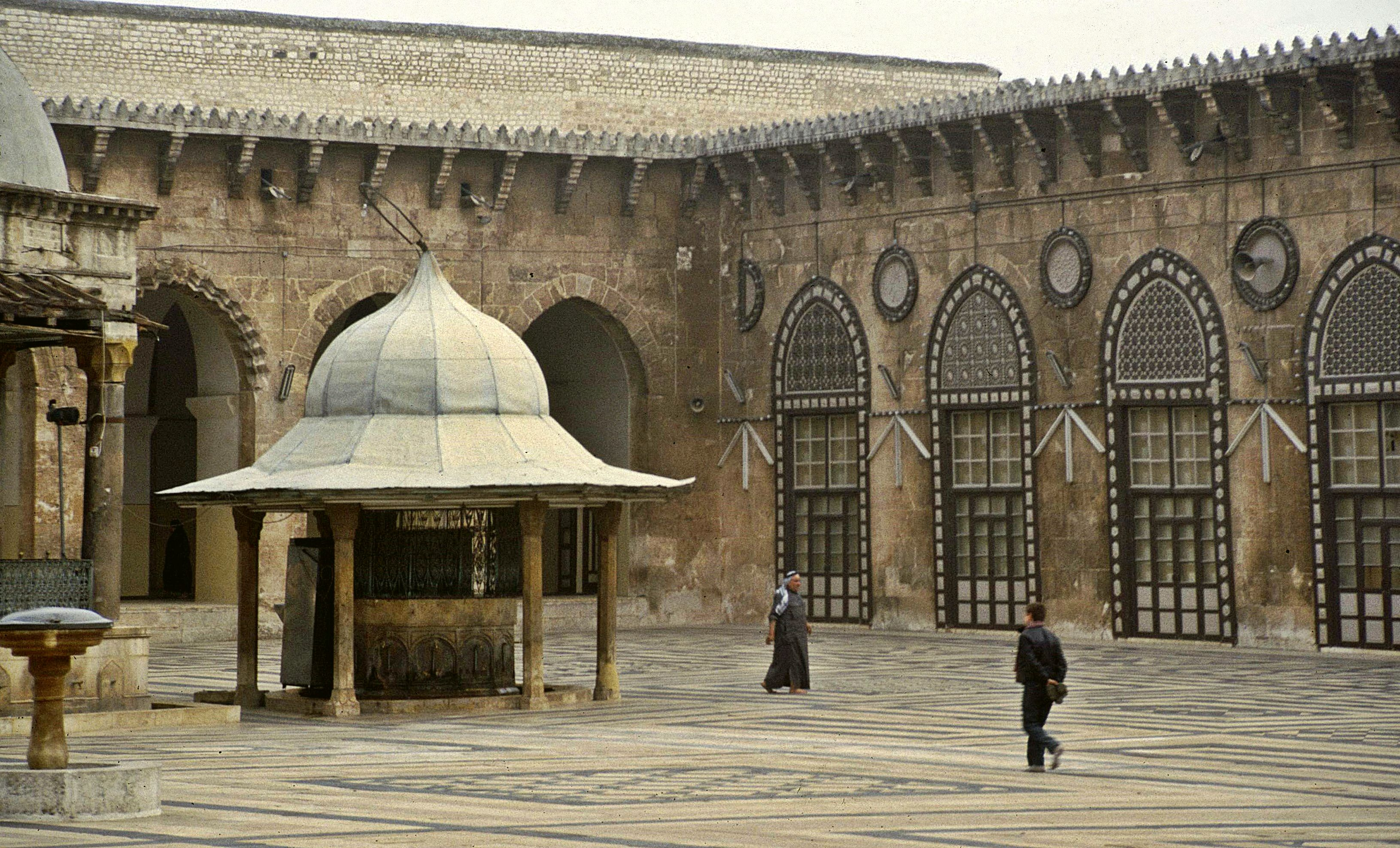
The courtyard of the mosque in 1987

=== Courtyard ===
The Great Mosque contains a number of architectural similarities to the Great Mosque of Damascus, including a hypostyle plan with large marbled courtyard surrounded by porticoes. The vast courtyard connects to different areas of the mosque, positioned behind the colonnaded arcade. The courtyard is well known for its alternating black and white stone floor that forms intricate geometric arrangements. Two ablutions fountains, both of which are roofed. The courtyard also has an open prayer estrade and a sundial.

=== Interior ===
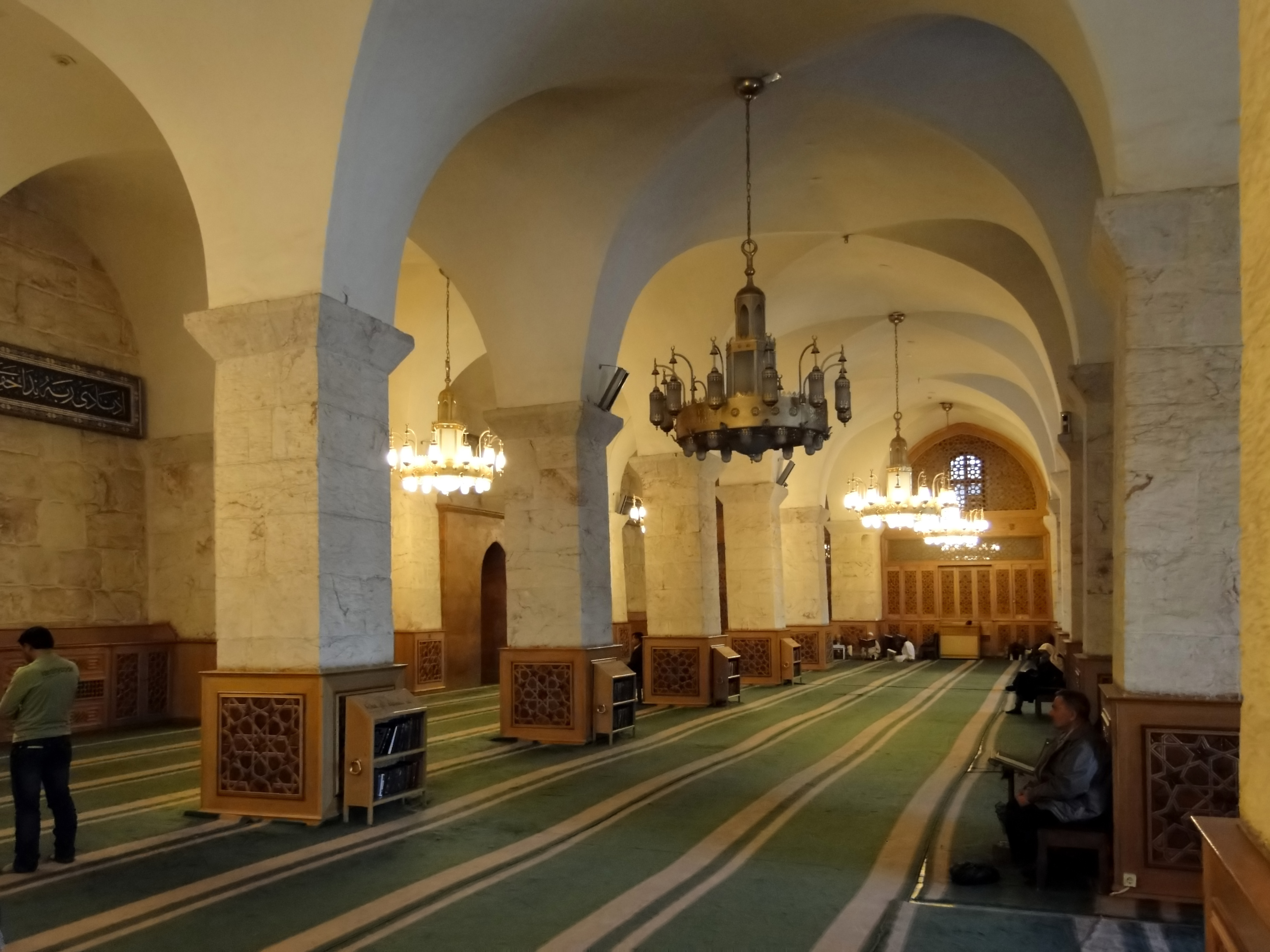
Inner view of the Mosque (2010)

The ḥaram ("sanctuary") consists of the main prayer hall to the courtyard's south, which contains the primary elements of the mosque: the shrine of Zechariah, a 15th-century minbar ("pulpit"), and an elaborately carved miḥrāb ("niche"). Although the central entrance contains an inscription attributing its construction to Ottoman sultan Murad III, it was built by the Mamluks. The hall has three naves, all lined with 18 quadrangular columns with cross-vaults. This large prayer hall originally had a basic straight rooftop with a central qubbah (dome, but during Mamluk rule was replaced with an intricate cross-vaulted system with arches and a small dome over the arcades. The mihrab is deep and round and Zechariah's supposed tomb is to its left along the southern wall.

There are three other halls that abut the remaining sides of the courtyard. The eastern and northern halls each have two naves, while the western hall has one. The latter is mostly of modern construction. The east hall dates to the period of Malik Shah (1072–1092) and the north hall was renovated during Mamluk sultan Barquq's reign (1382–1399), but largely maintained its original 11th century character.

=== Minaret ===
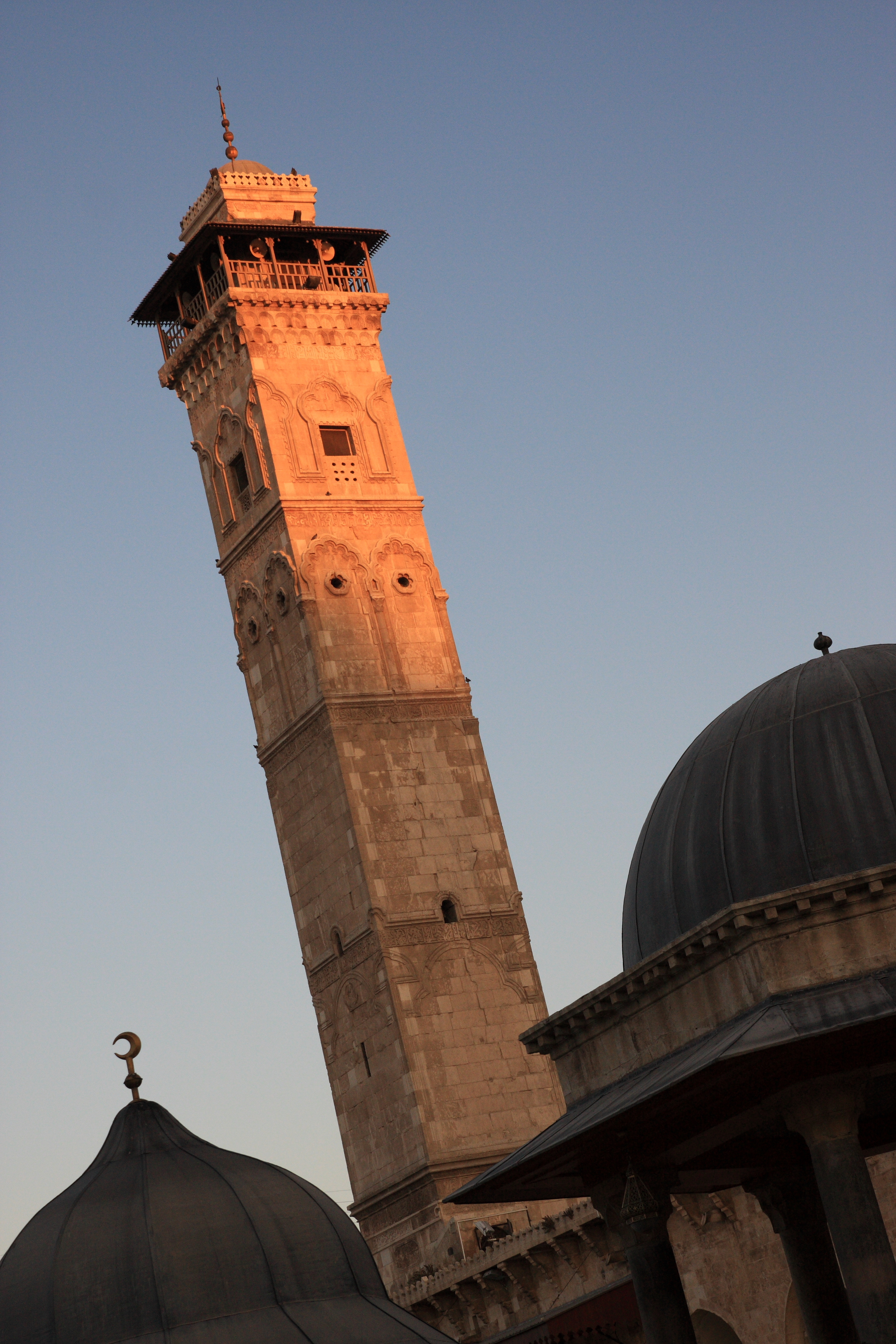
The minaret, before destruction in April 2013

The minaret's shaft, which protruded out of the flat roof of one of the halls, consisted of five levels with a crowning top encircled with a veranda. A muqarnas-style cornice divided the veranda top from the shaft. The structure was largely built of fine ashlar. The minaret was heavily decorated in relief ornament, more so than any other Islamic-era structure in Aleppo with the exception of the Shu'aybiyah Madrasa. Its stories contained cusped arches and continuous mouldings. The masonry of the minaret varied throughout, with a mix of light and heavy usage of toothed tools, short, long, vertical and horizontal strokes, fine and rough finishes, and small and large stones.

According to E.J. Brill's First Encyclopaedia of Islam, the minaret was "quite unique in the whole of Muslim architecture". Archaeologist Ernst Herzfeld described the architectural style of the minaret as being "the product of Mediterranean civilization," writing that its four façades carried elements of Gothic architecture. Meanwhile, anthropologist Yasser Tabbaa stated the mosque was a continuation of the ancient North Syrian churches and "an entirely localized phenomenon, centered mainly in the region between Aleppo and Edessa". The decoration of the minaret demonstrates a level of continuity with pre-Islamic Syrian architecture.

=== Maqsurah ===
The Great Mosque has a small museum annexed to it containing a number of ancient manuscripts. Similar to the Great Mosque of Damascus, a maqsurah was built in the form of a square domed room raised by one step above the floor level of the prayer hall, and adorned with Kashan tiles that cover all the internal surfaces of its walls. A large arched gate supported by two robust columns and topped with capitals as well as a bronze door screen comprise the entranceways to the maqsurah. The tomb containing the remains of the Prophet Zakariah, decorated with silver embroideries containing Quranic verses from the chapter of Mariyam, was located in the center of the room. The museum's number of valuable objects, including a box purportedly containing a strand of the Prophet Muhammad's hair, were subject to looting during the Syrian War in the 2013 clash. However, rebels claimed they had instead salvaged ancient handwritten Koranic manuscripts and hidden them.

== Gallery ==
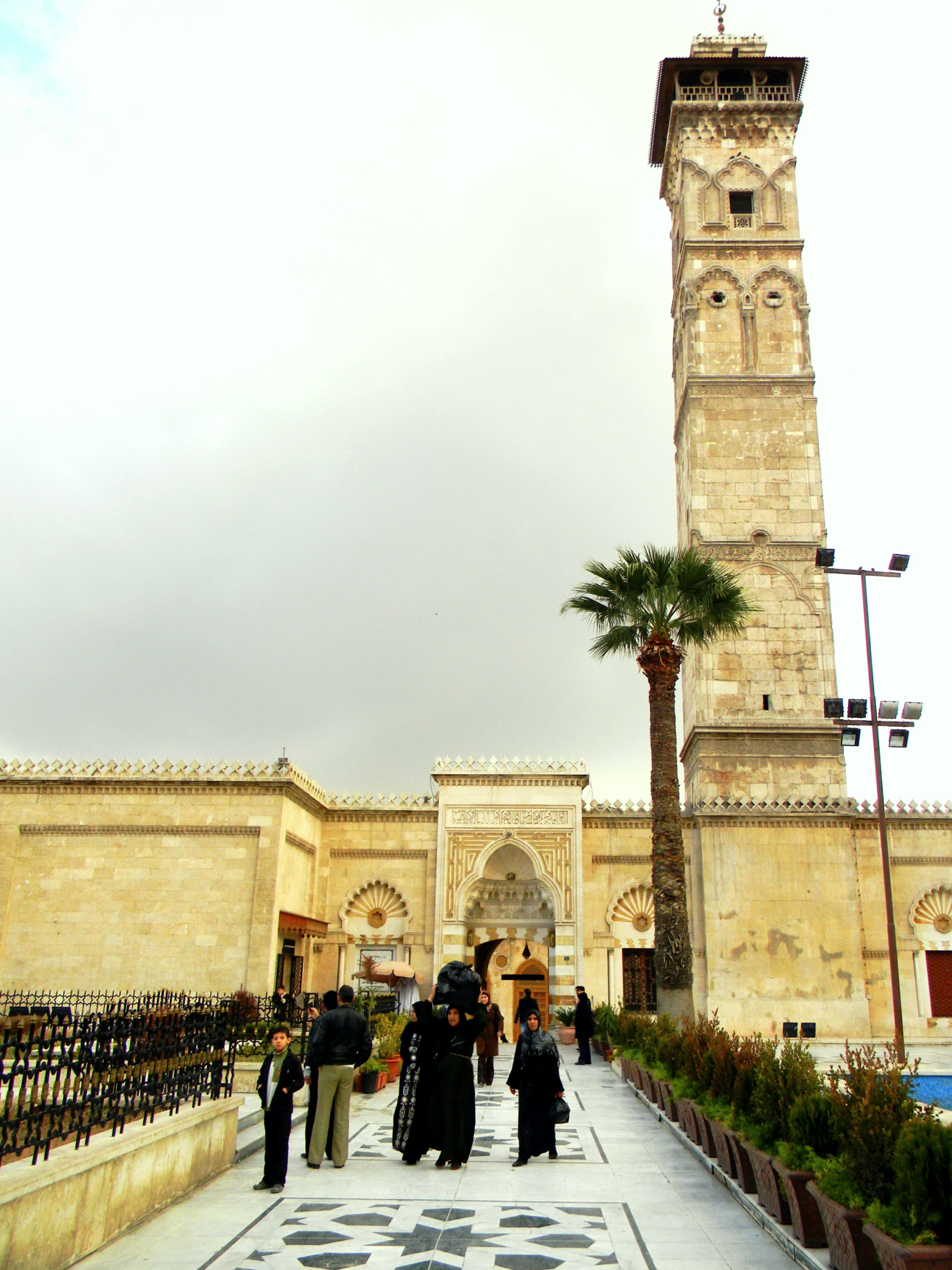
Exterior of the mosque

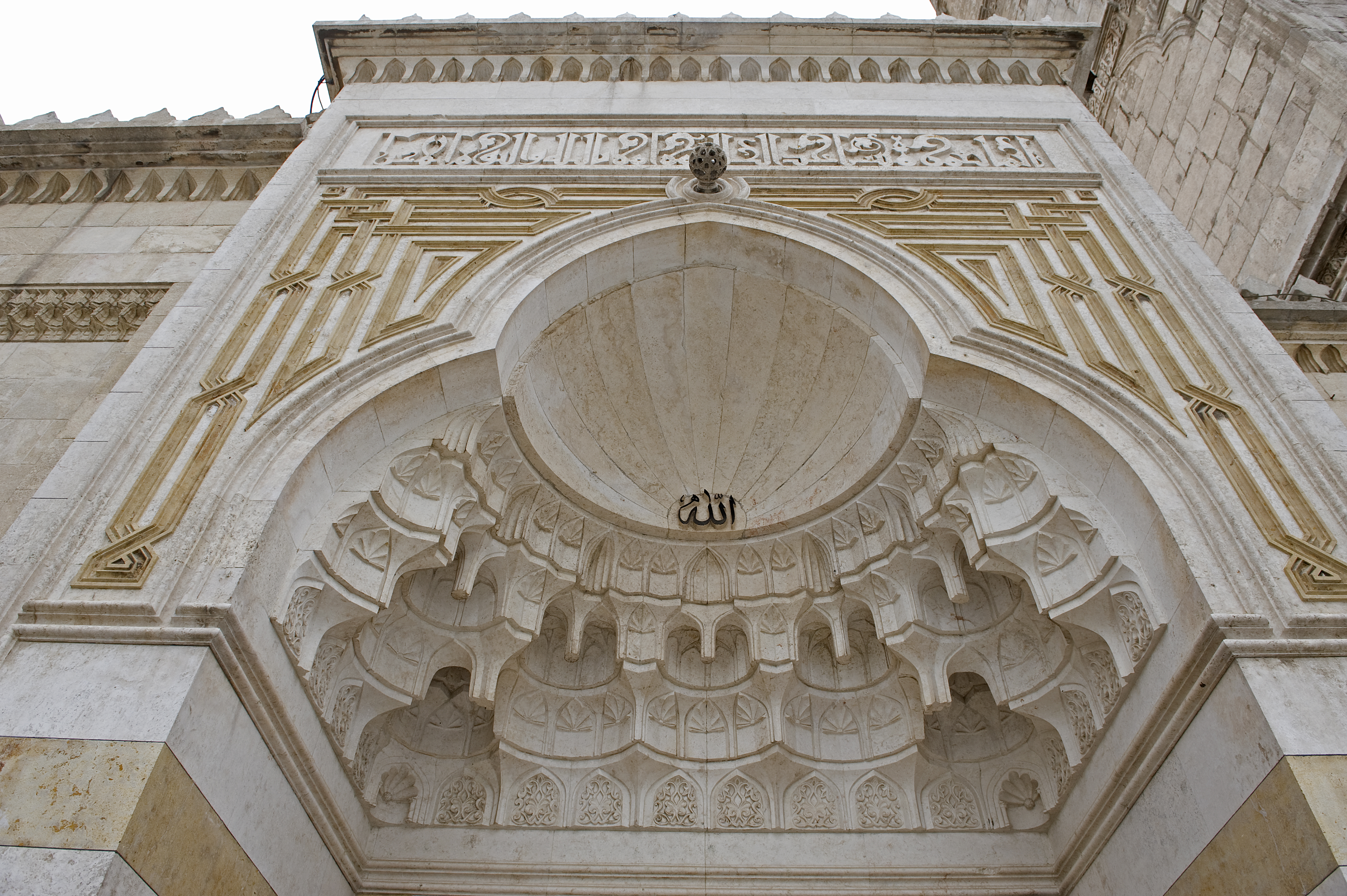
Muqarnas at the mosque entrance

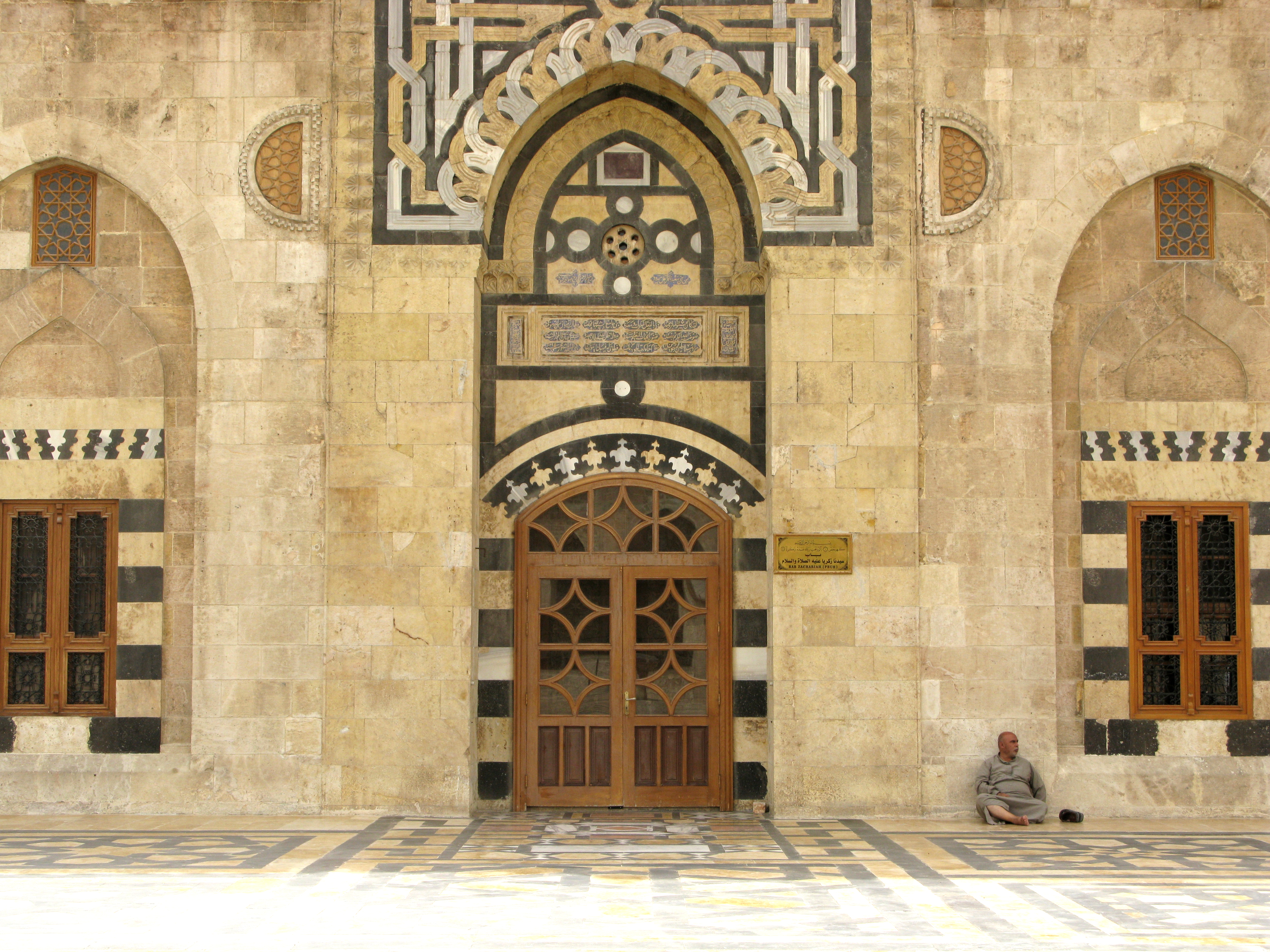
Islamic ornaments on façade (2008)

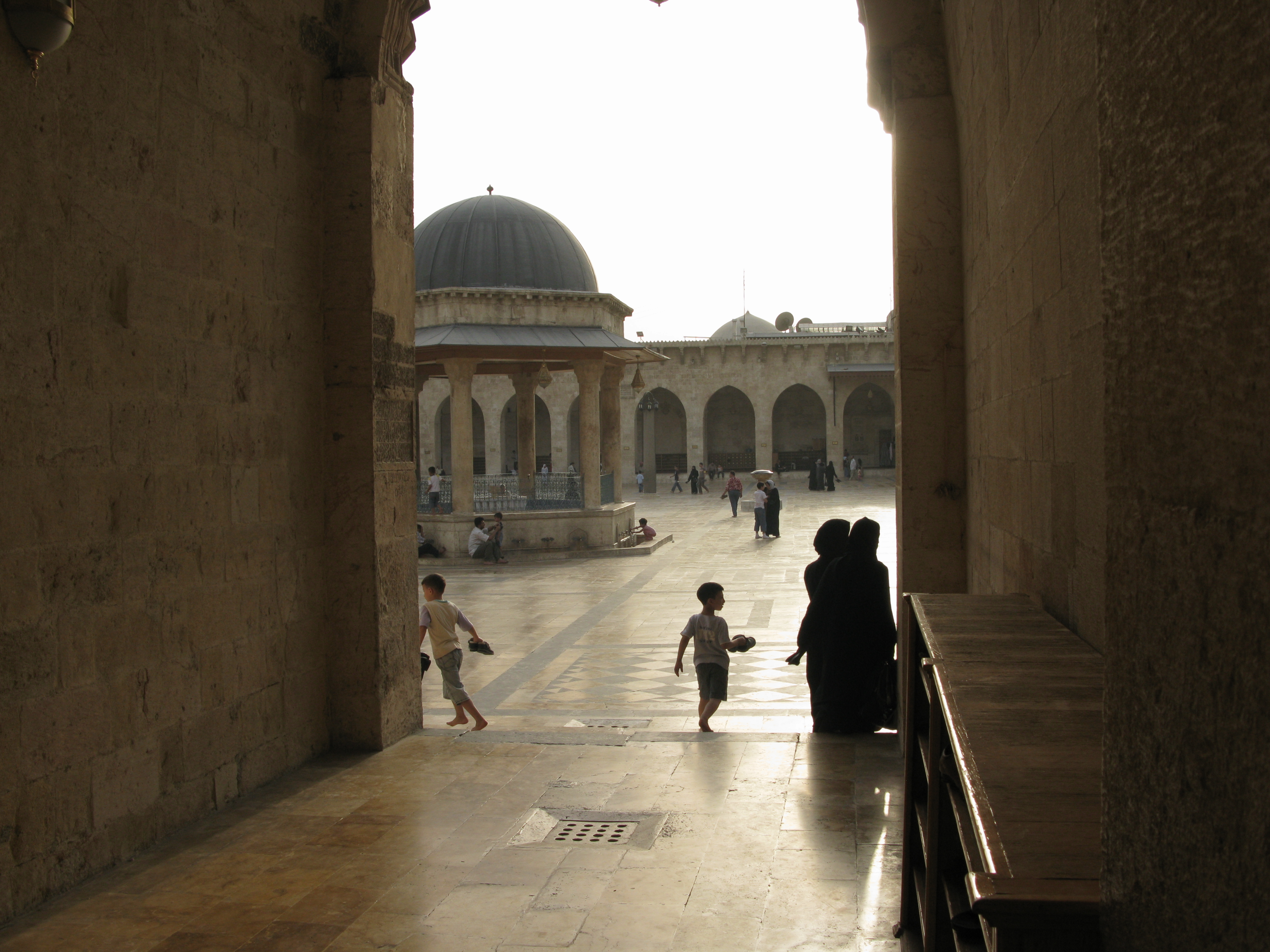
The gate (2008)

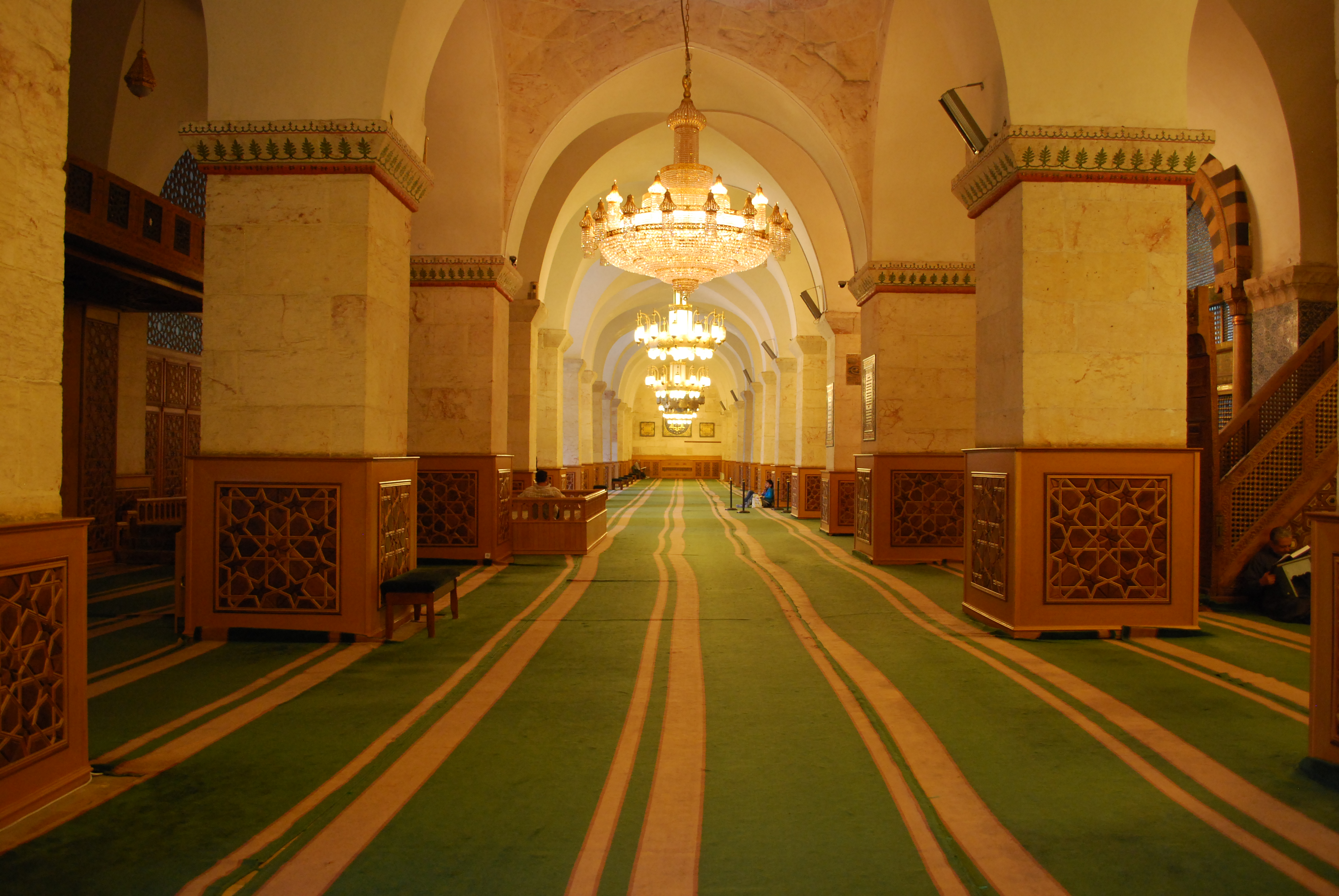
interior of the mosque (2010)

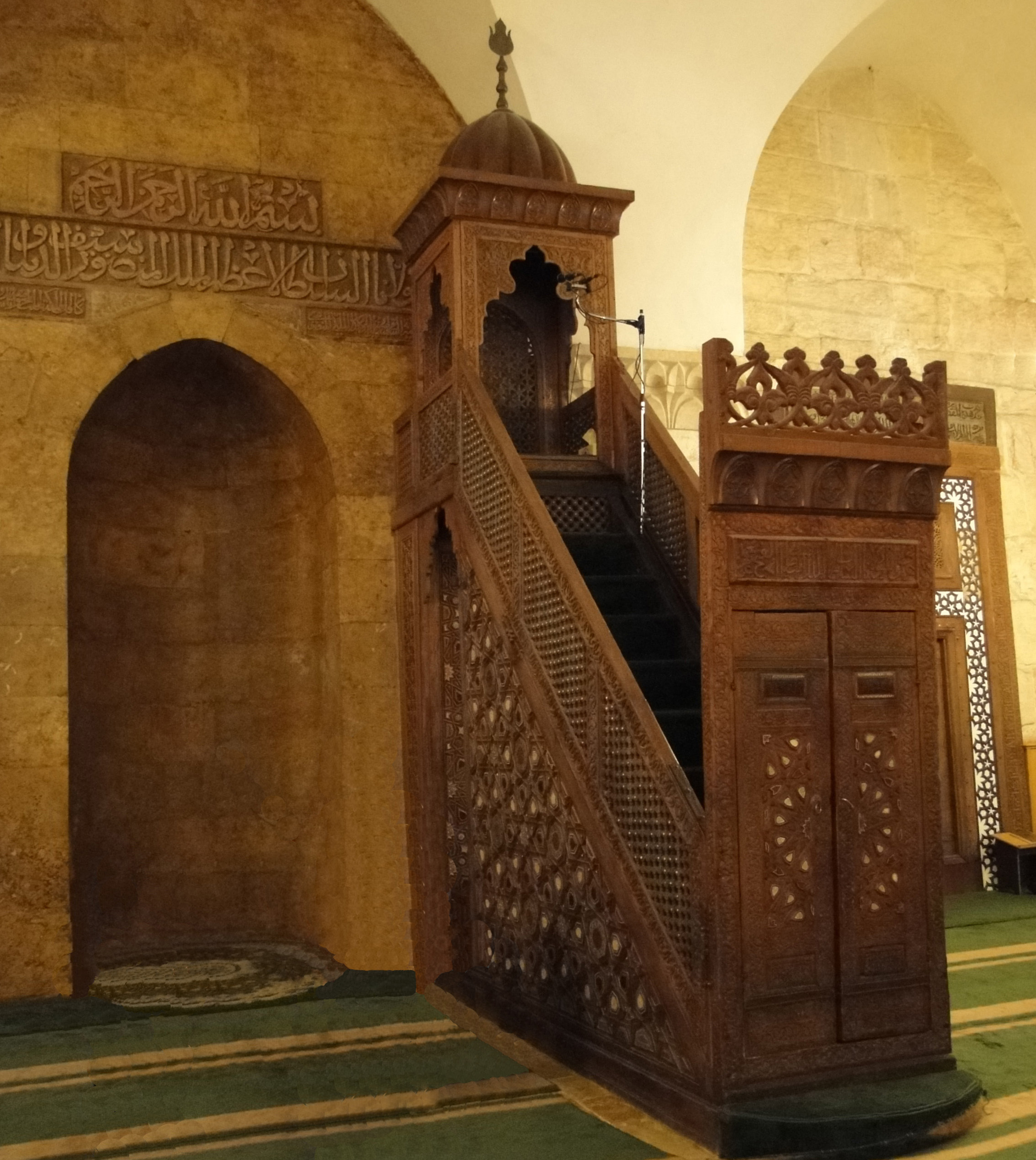
Mihrab and minbar of the Mosque (2010)

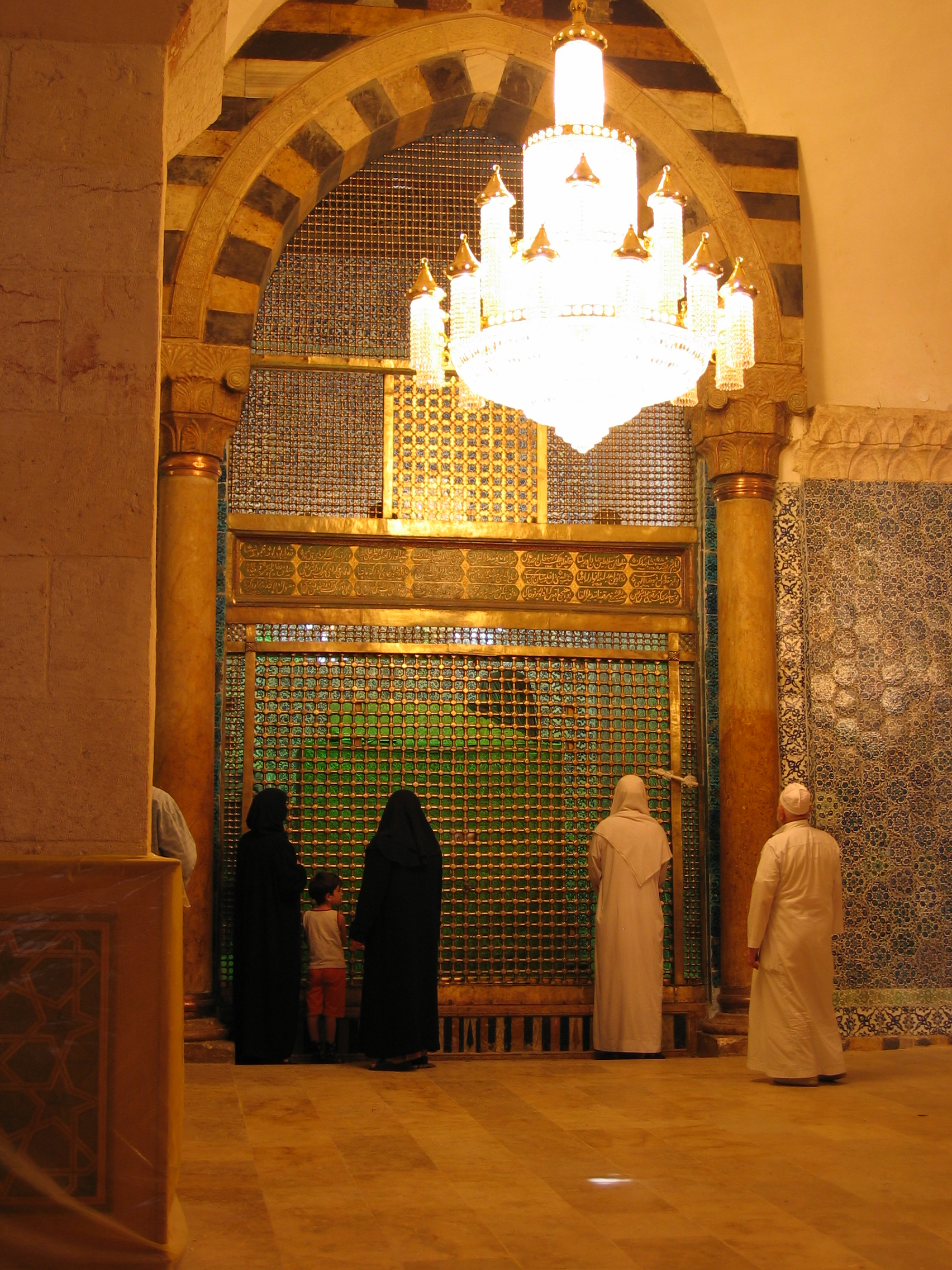
The shrine of Zechariah within the Mosque (2005)

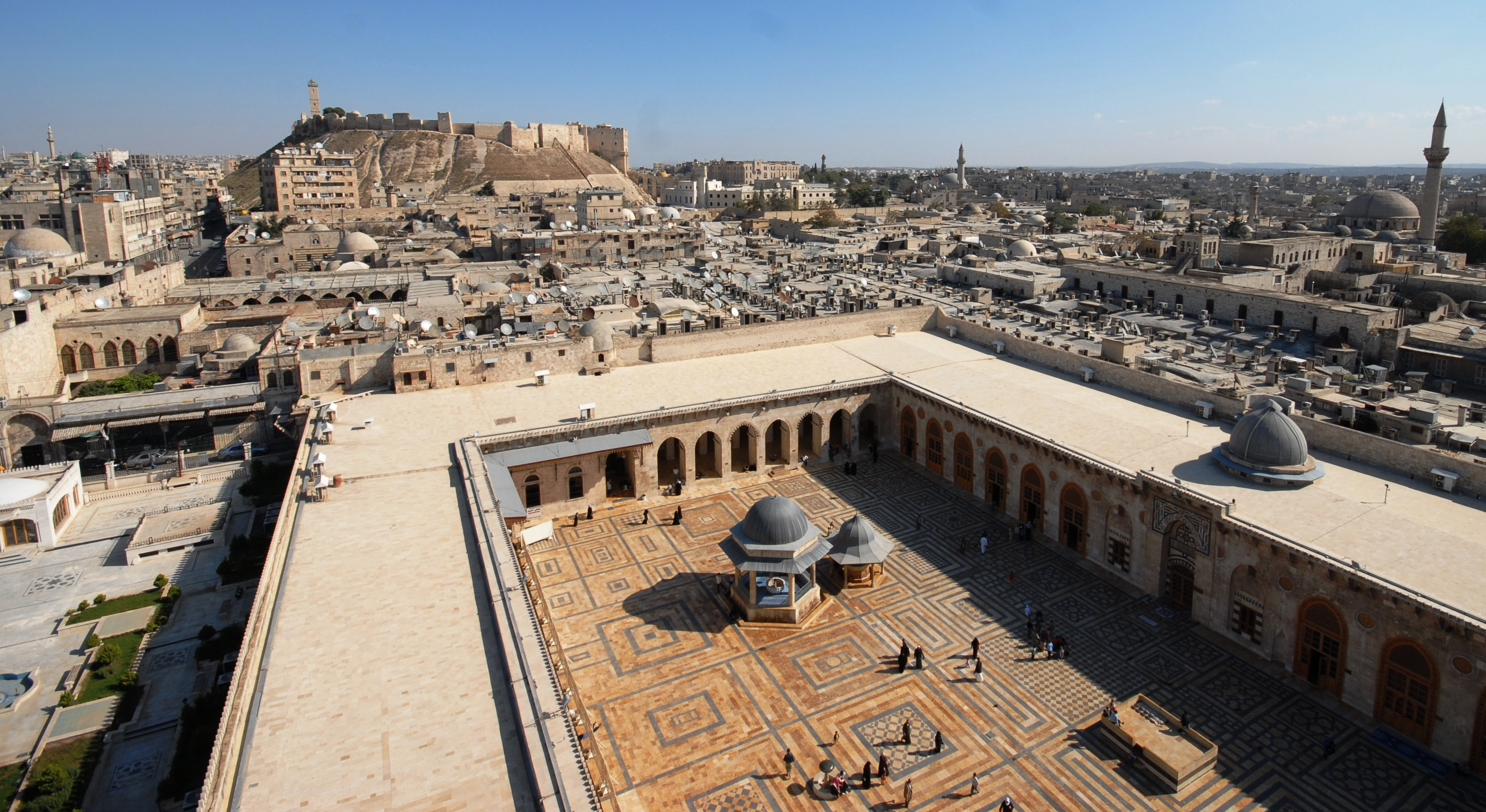
View of the courtyard from the minaret (2009)

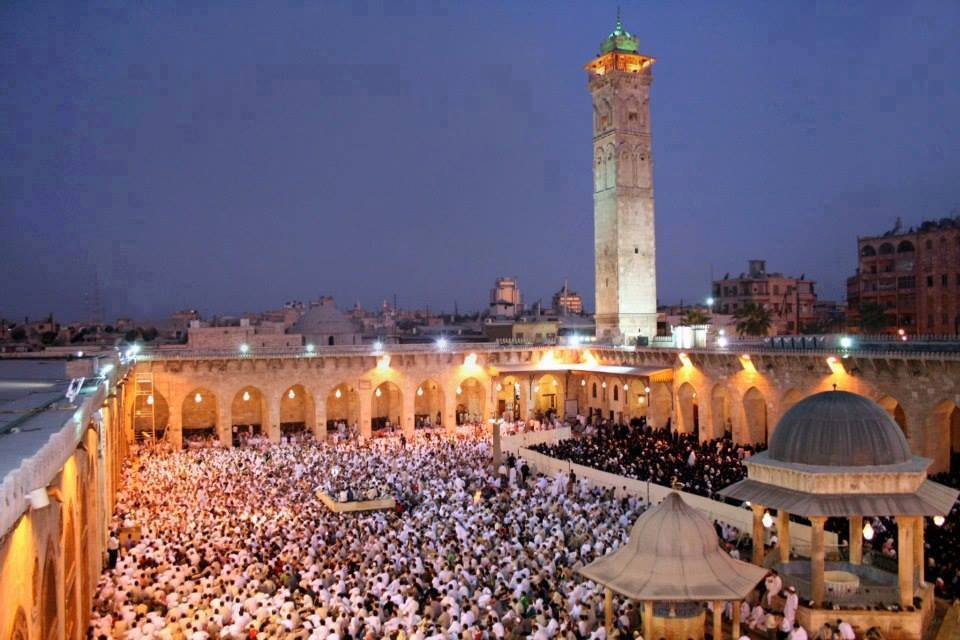
Full view of the mosque (2014)

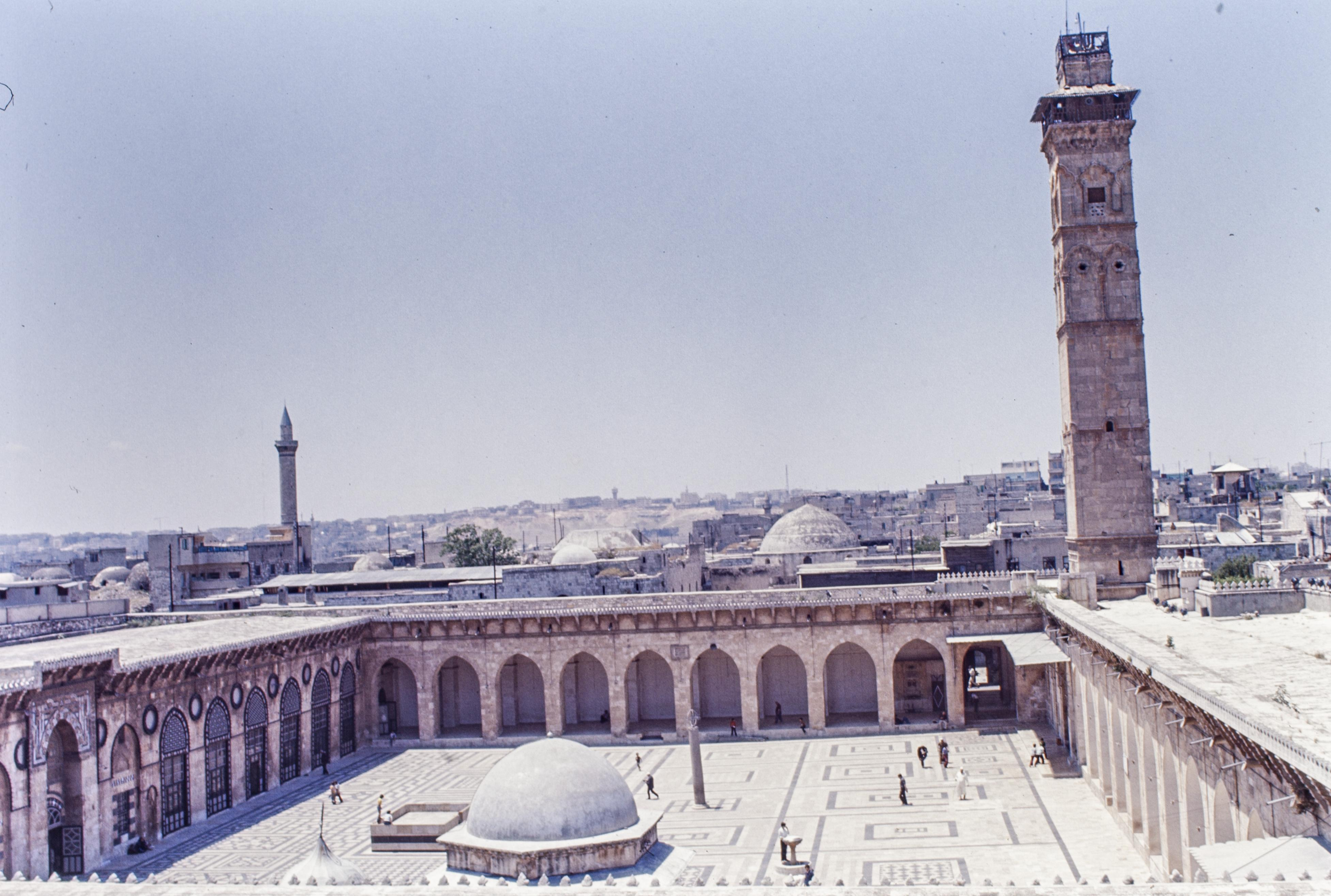
Courtyard in 1977

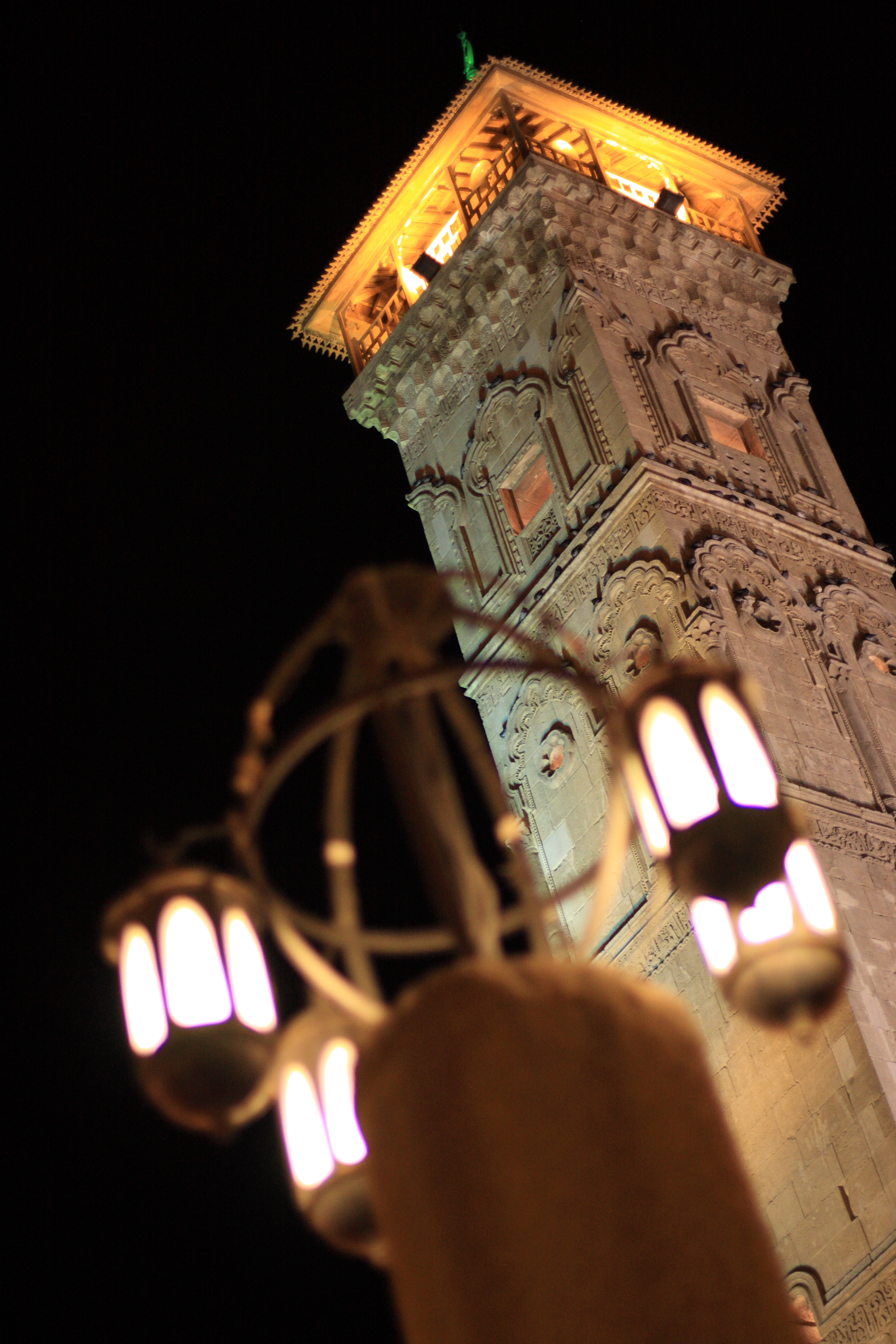
Upper minaret, before 2013 destruction

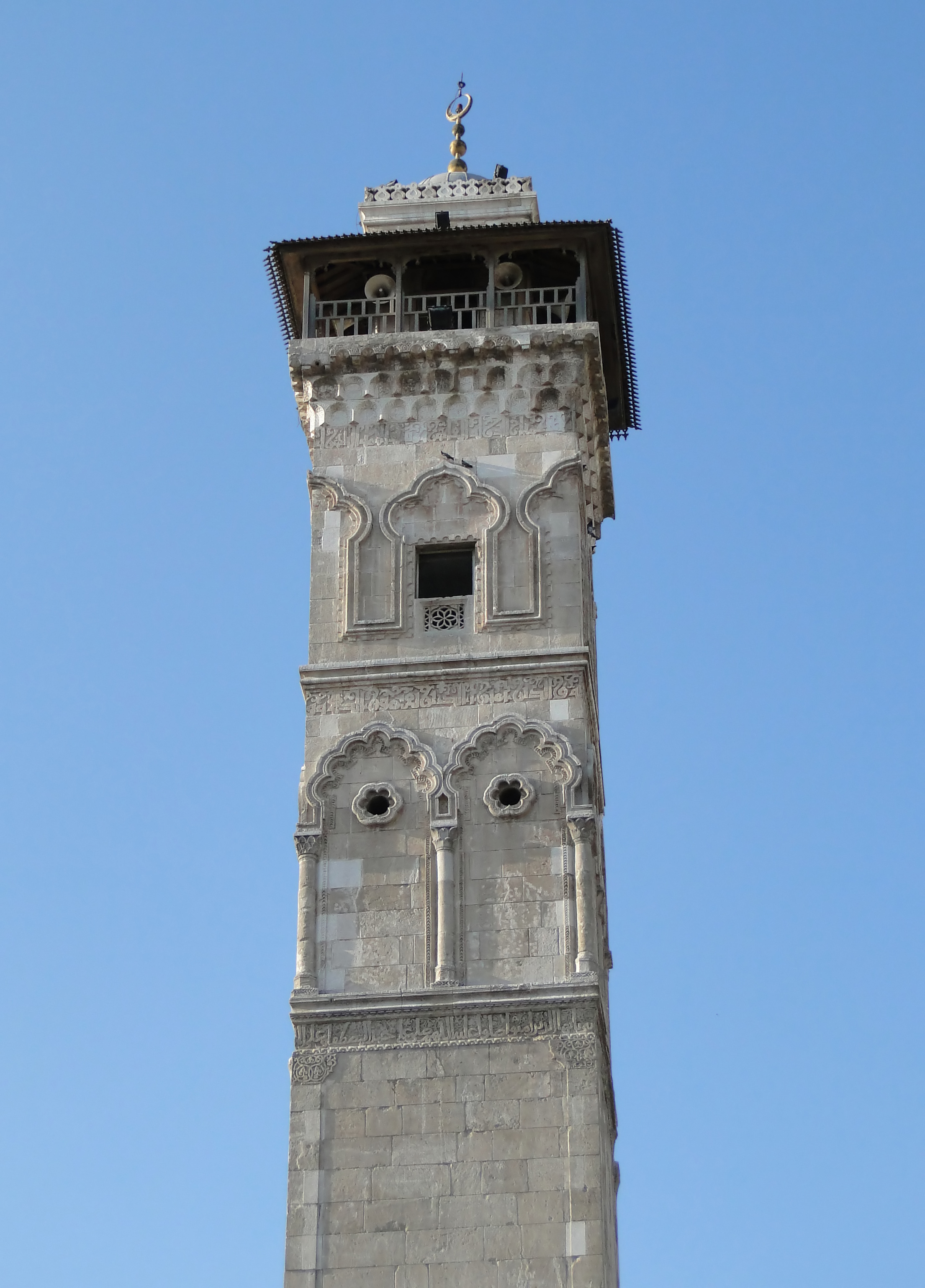
Upper minaret details (2010)

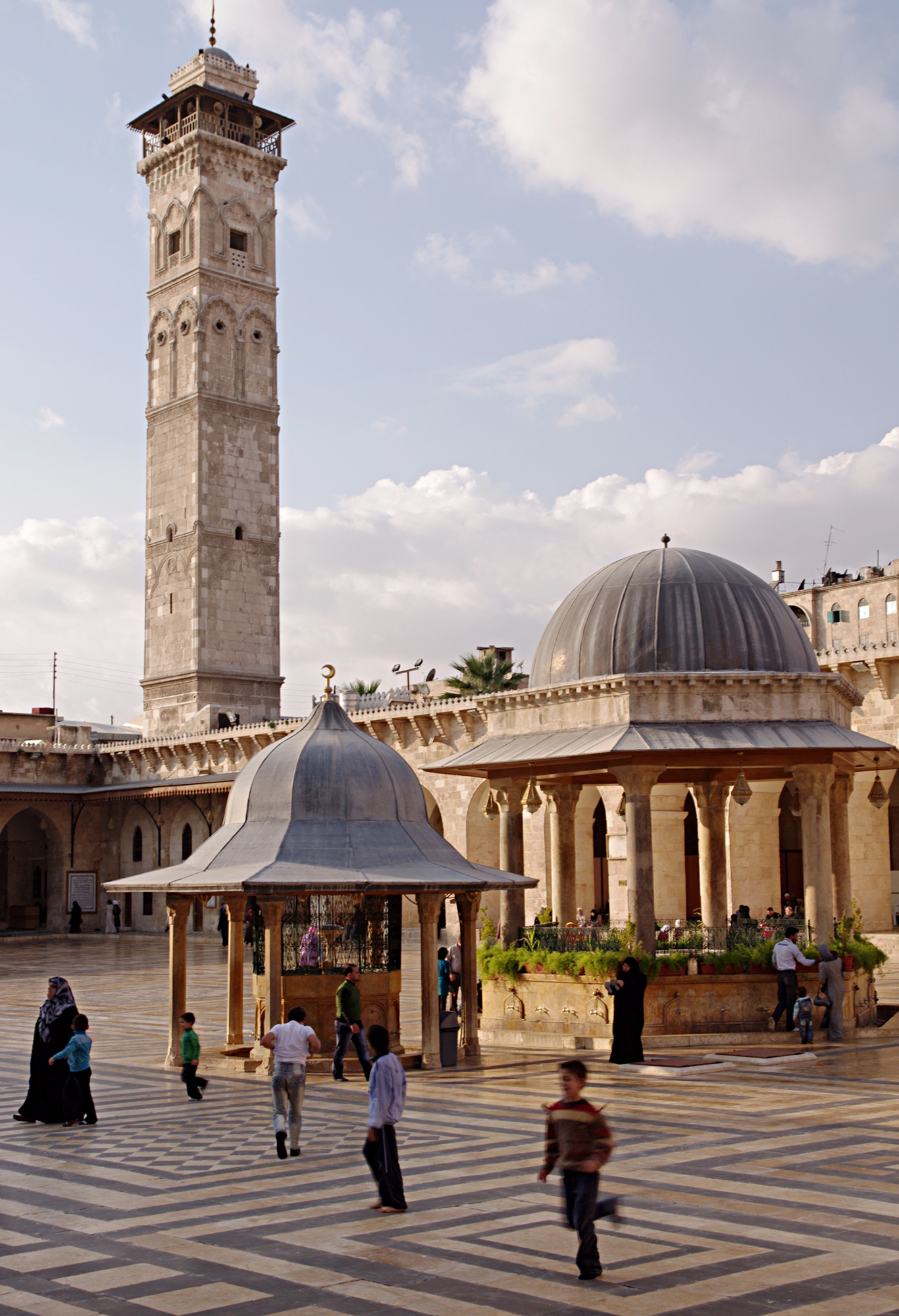
Minaret and ablution fountains (2011)

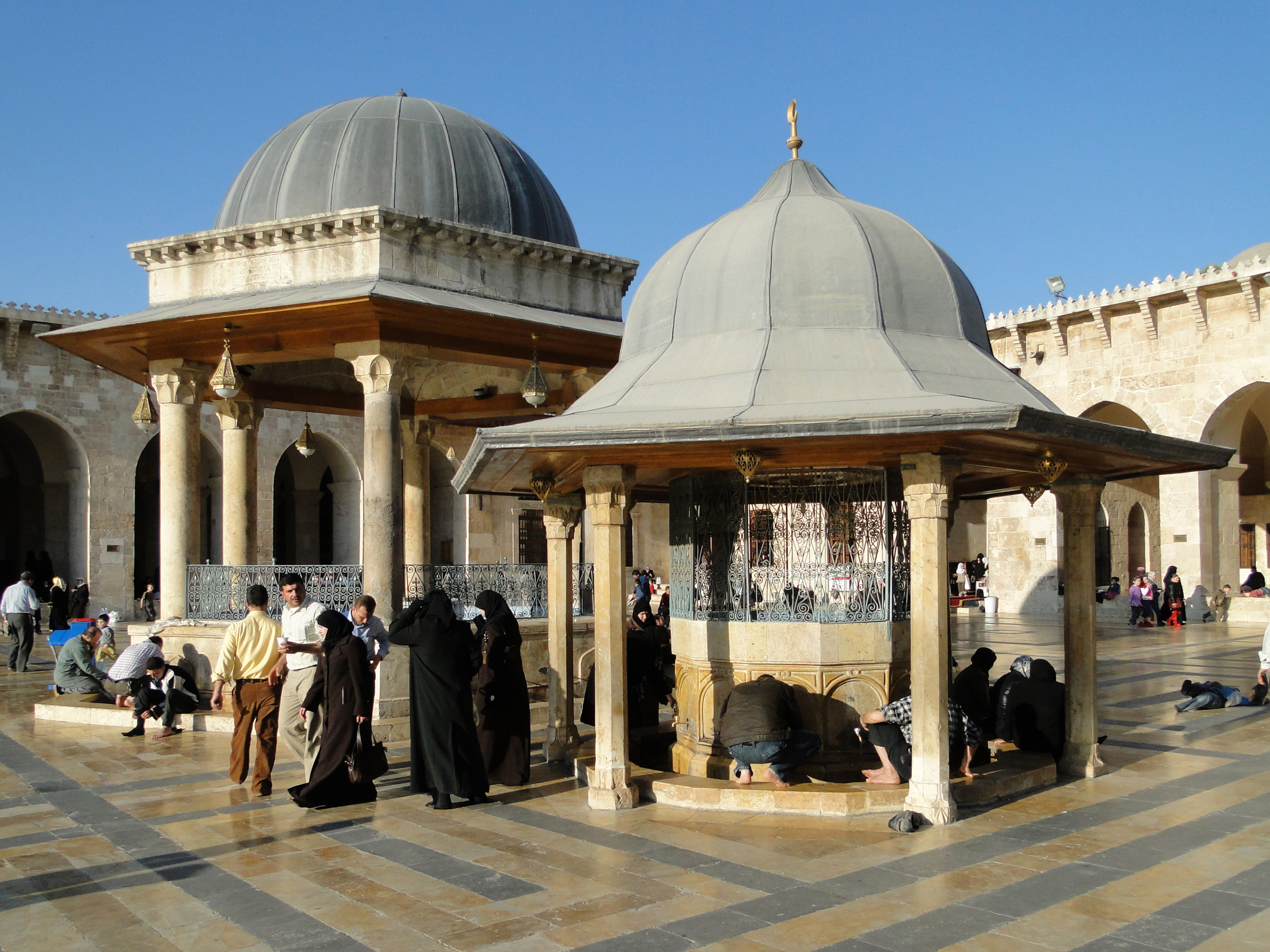
Ablution fountains (2010)

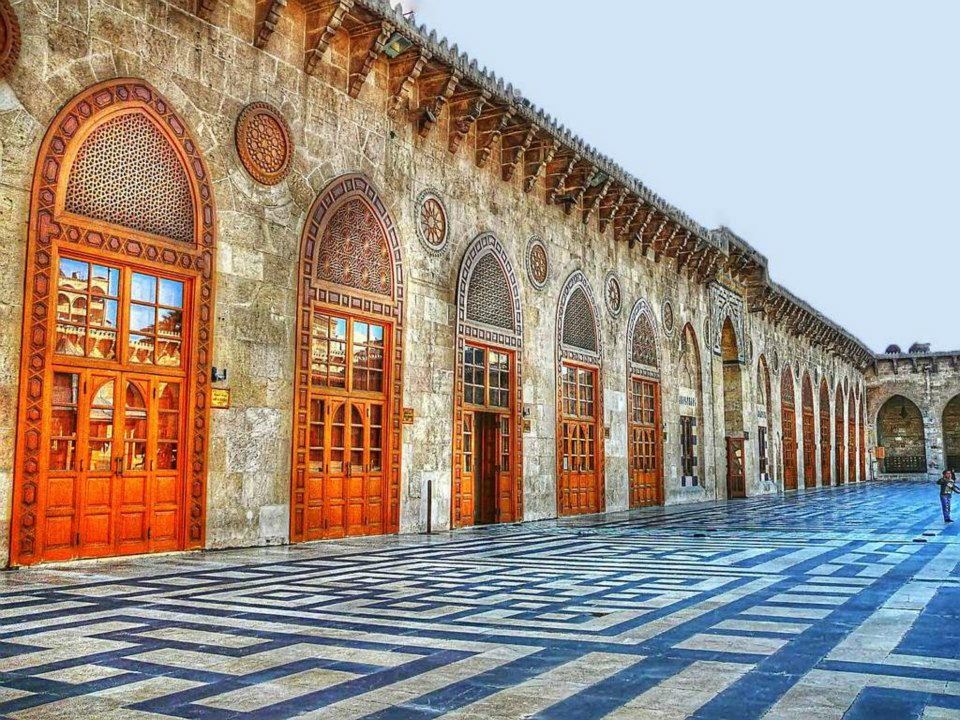
Inside view of the Great Mosque of Aleppo (2014)

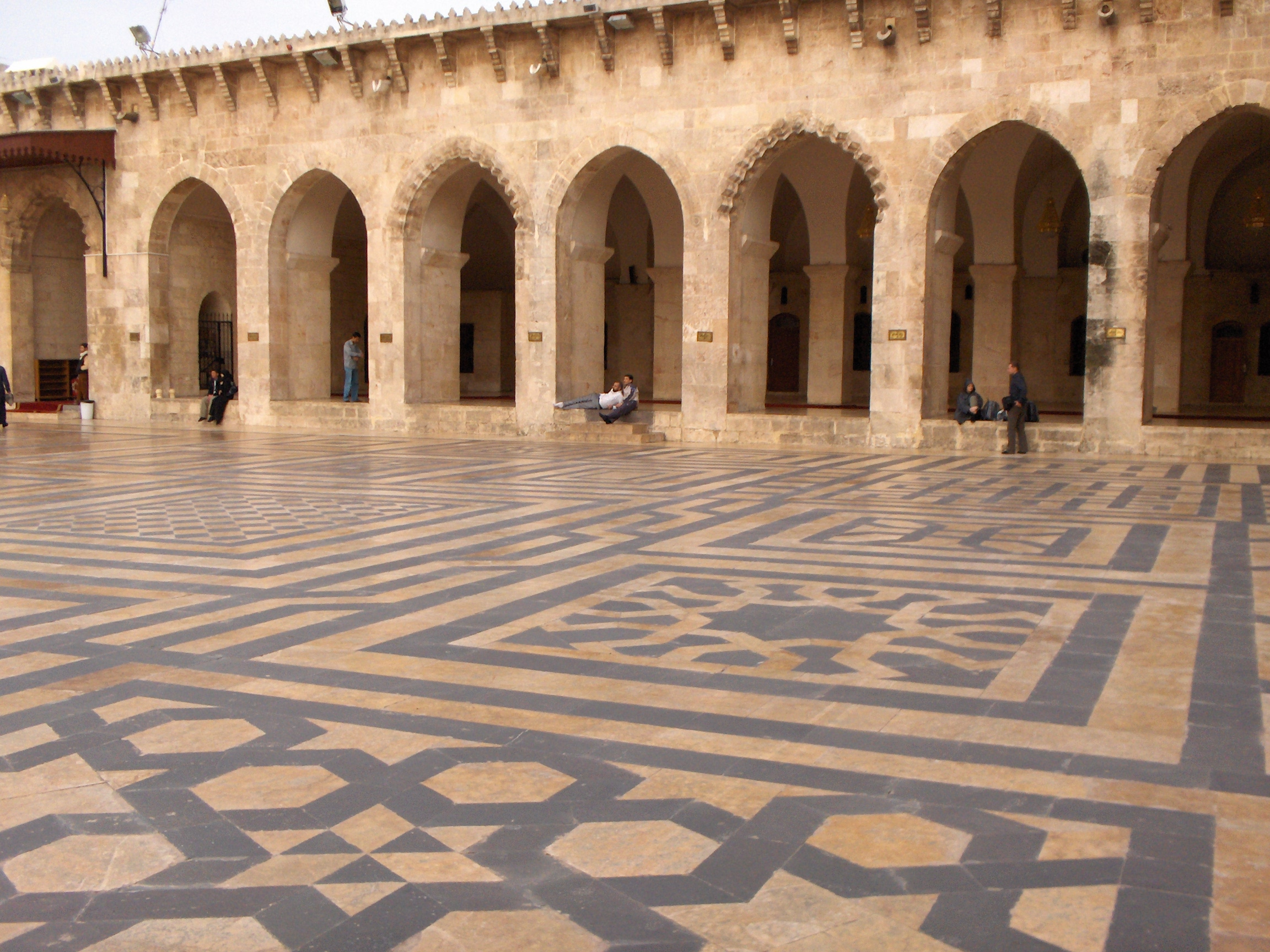
Courtyard riwaq's (2010)

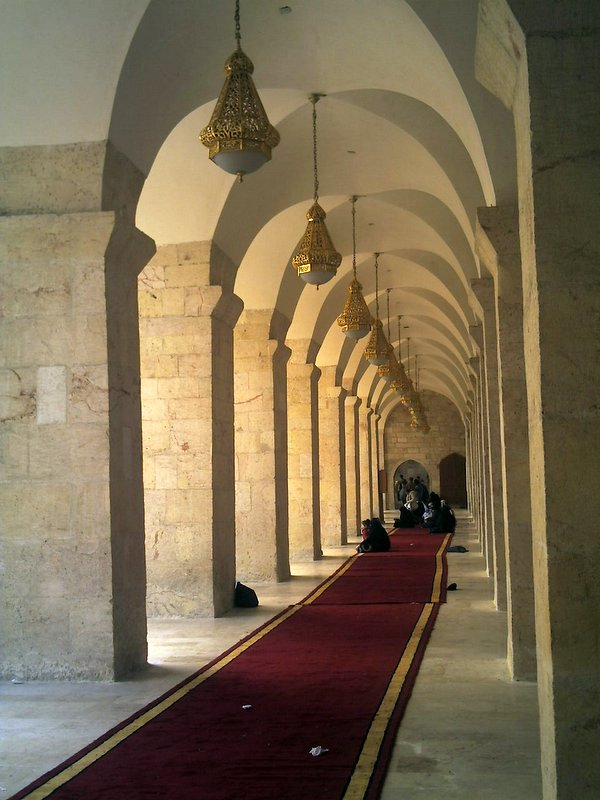
The riwaq (arcade)

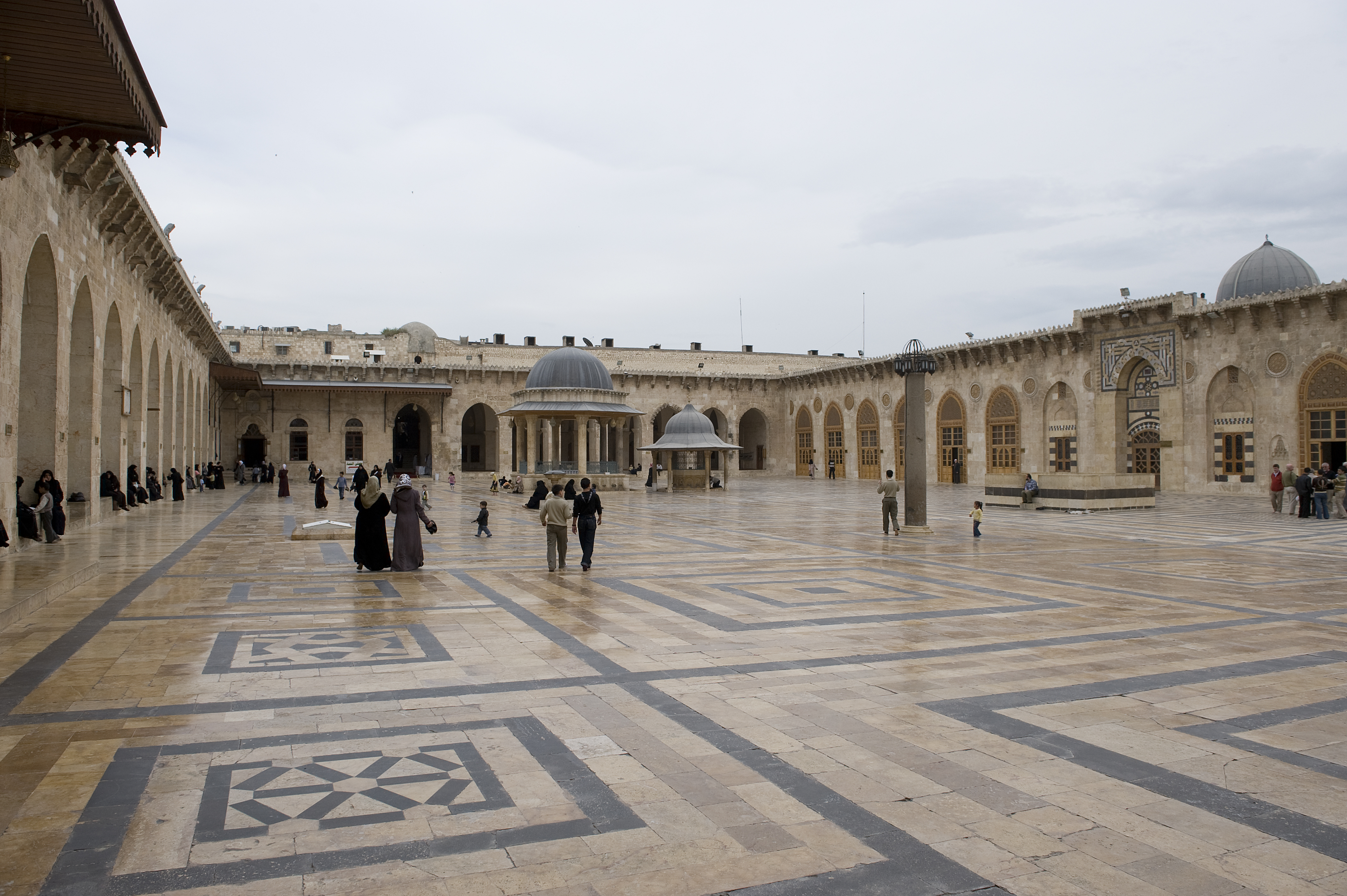
The courtyard of the mosque (2010)

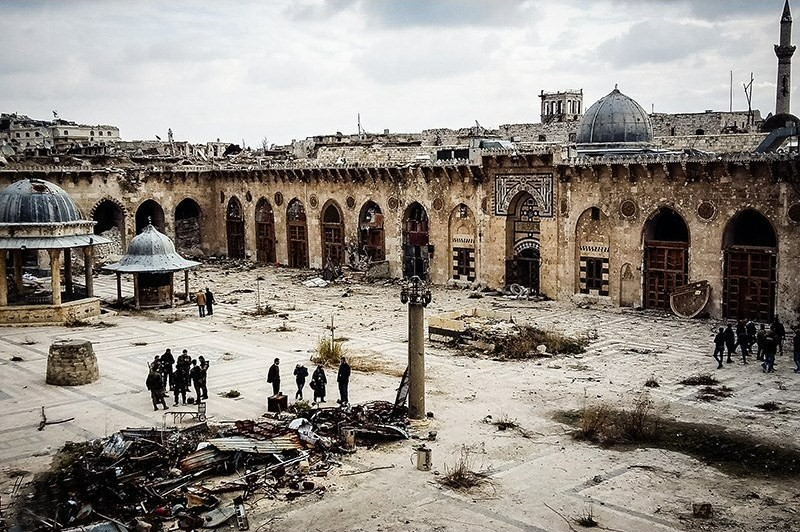
The courtyard of the mosque after the destruction (December 2016)

== See also ==
- Citadel of Aleppo
- Sunni Islam in Syria
- List of mosques in Aleppo
- List of mosques in Syria
- List of heritage sites damaged during the Syrian civil war
- Religious significance of the Syrian region
- Umayyad Mosque of Baalbek
- Umayyad Mosque of Damascus
