= Shaykh Abd al-Rahman al-Marwani al-Dimashqi =

Syrian jurist, preacher, and waqf administrator of the Umayyad Mosque in Damascus

Sheikh Abd al-Rahman Muhammad al-Marwani
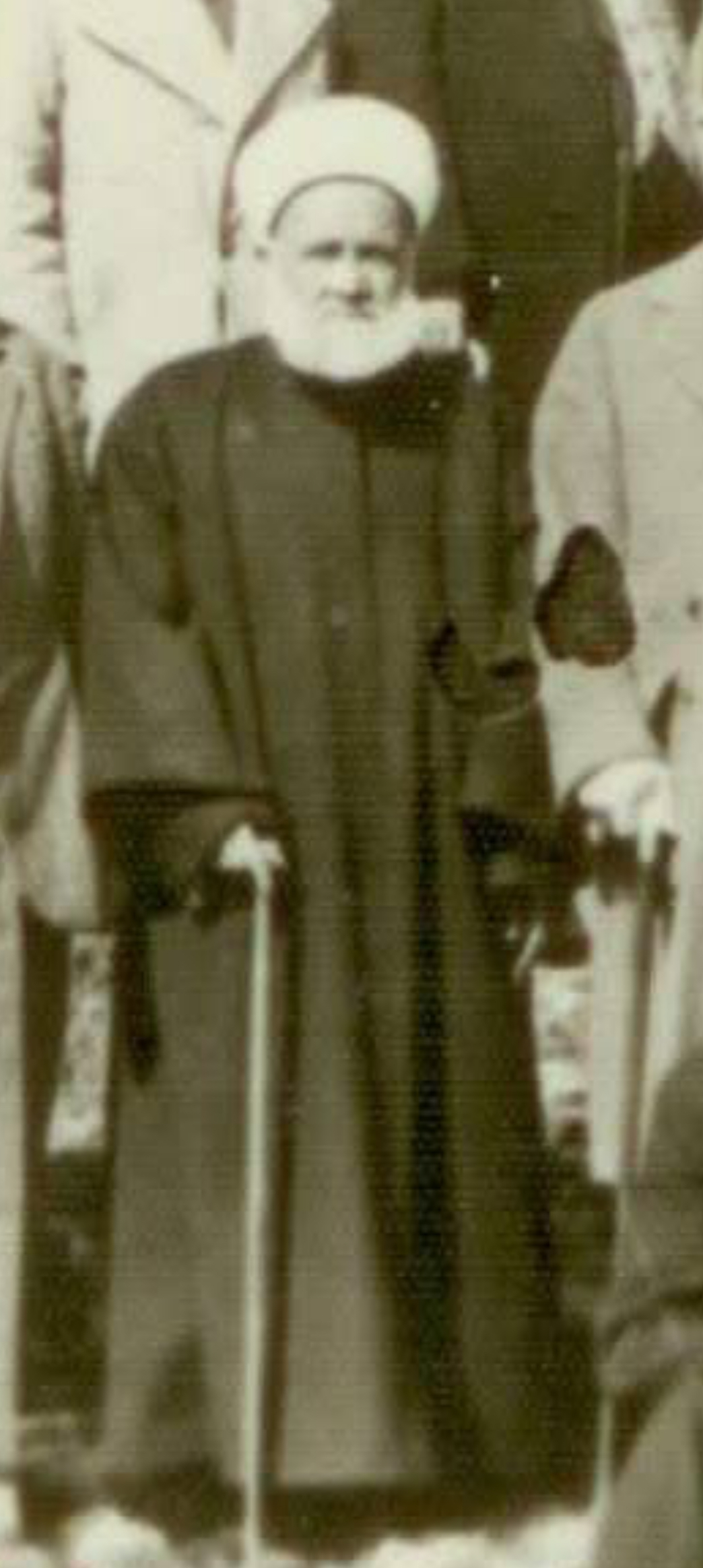
- Sheikh Abdul Rahman Muhammad al-Marwani c. 1940, Damascus

Personal life
- Born: Abd al-Rahman Muhammad al-Marwani c. 1870 Damascus, Ottoman Empire
- Died: Damascus, Syria
- Citizenship: Ottoman & Syrian
- Era: Ottoman Era and French Mandate Era
- Occupation: Khatib of the Umayyad Mosque and nazir of the Waqf Āl al-Marwani

Religious life
- Religion: Islam
- Denomination: Sunni
- Lineage: Al-Marwani family
- Jurisprudence: Hanafi
- Creed: Ash'ari

ʿAbd al-Raḥmān ibn Muḥammad al-Marwānī al-Dimashqī (Arabic: عبد الرحمن محمد المرواني الدمشقي; fl. 1910–1930) was a Syrian Hanafi jurist, preacher, and waqf administrator associated with the Umayyad Mosque of Damascus. A member of the locally prominent Al-Marwani family, descended from the Umayyads through Marwan I, he was active during the late Ottoman and early Mandate periods. Contemporary court registers and biographical records describe him as one of the hereditary custodians of the Umayyad Mosque and an administrator of several family endowments (awqāf) in Damascus.

== Biography ==
The family resided primarily in the Suq al-Saruja and Qanawāt quarters, where several of its members held positions connected with the Umayyad Mosque. Archival sijillāt (Shariʿa-court registers) record him as ʿAbd al-Raḥmān ibn Muḥammad al-Marwānī, preacher (khaṭīb) and Qurʾān teacher (mudarris) at the Umayyad Mosque between 1335 and 1341 AH (1917–1923 CE).

=== Local biographical notice ===
The Damascene scholar ʿAbd al-Qadir al-Salihi devoted a short notice to him in his manuscript biographical dictionary ʿUlamāʾ Dimashq fī al-Qarn al-Tāsiʿ ʿAshar (MS no. 297, University of Damascus Library). There he describes:

“ʿAbd al-Raḥmān ibn Muḥammad al-Marwānī al-Dimashqī, min dhurriyyat Banī Umayya, khaṭīb al-Jāmiʿ al-Umawī wa-nāẓir ʿalā waqf Āl al-Marwānī; ʿurifa bi-taqwāhu wa-ḥifẓihi wa-ṣidqihi fī al-khidma.”

which translates roughly as: “ʿAbd al-Raḥmān ibn Muḥammad al-Marwānī al-Dimashqī, of the descendants of the Banū Umayya, preacher of the Umayyad Mosque and overseer of the al-Marwani family endowment; he was known for his piety, learning, and sincerity in service.”

His sermons and teaching emphasized adherence to the Hanafi school and preservation of the Umayyad Mosque's intellectual tradition. Local accounts describe him as a conciliatory figure between the mosque's traditional ʿulamāʾ and reformist scholars emerging in the 1920s.

== Legacy ==
Al-Marwānī’s descendants remained active in religious and civic roles in Damascus throughout the 20th century, several continuing to supervise family endowments or teach at the Umayyad Mosque. He is remembered within the Marwani-Umayyad genealogical tradition as one of the last hereditary preachers to serve under Ottoman appointment before the Mandate reorganization of the mosque's administration.

== See also ==
- Waqf
- Islam in Syria
