= Abu Nasr Ahmad ibn Fadl =

Abu Nasr Ahmad ibn Fadl (Arabic: أبو نصر أحمد بن فضل) (died 1126) was the vizier of the Seljuk ruler of Damascus, Tutush.

On his orders, the Umayyad Mosque was restored in 1082 following the severe damage inflicted upon it during a fire in 1069. In particular, he had its central dome replaced, the piers supporting the dome reinforced, and the original Umayyad-era mosaics in the interior of the mosque's northern facade renewed.

According to Muslim historian Ibn al-Athir, Ahmad ibn Fadl led an attack on the Ismailis of Syria in 1126. Al-Athir states that Ahmad ibn Fadl gave his troops orders to "slaughter" the Ismailis, plunder their goods and take their women into captivity. He was assassinated by the Ismailis the same year as retaliation.

== Bibliography ==
- Burns, Ross (2005), Damascus: A History, London: Routledge, ISBN 0-415-27105-3.
- Royal Asiatic Society of Great Britain and Ireland (1897), Journal of the Royal Asiatic Society of Great Britain & Ireland, Cambridge University Press for the Royal Asiatic Society.
