= Temple of Jupiter, Damascus =

Roman temple in Damascus, Syria

Coordinates: 33.511552°N 36.3038°E

Temple of Jupiter
- معبد جوبتر (Arabic)
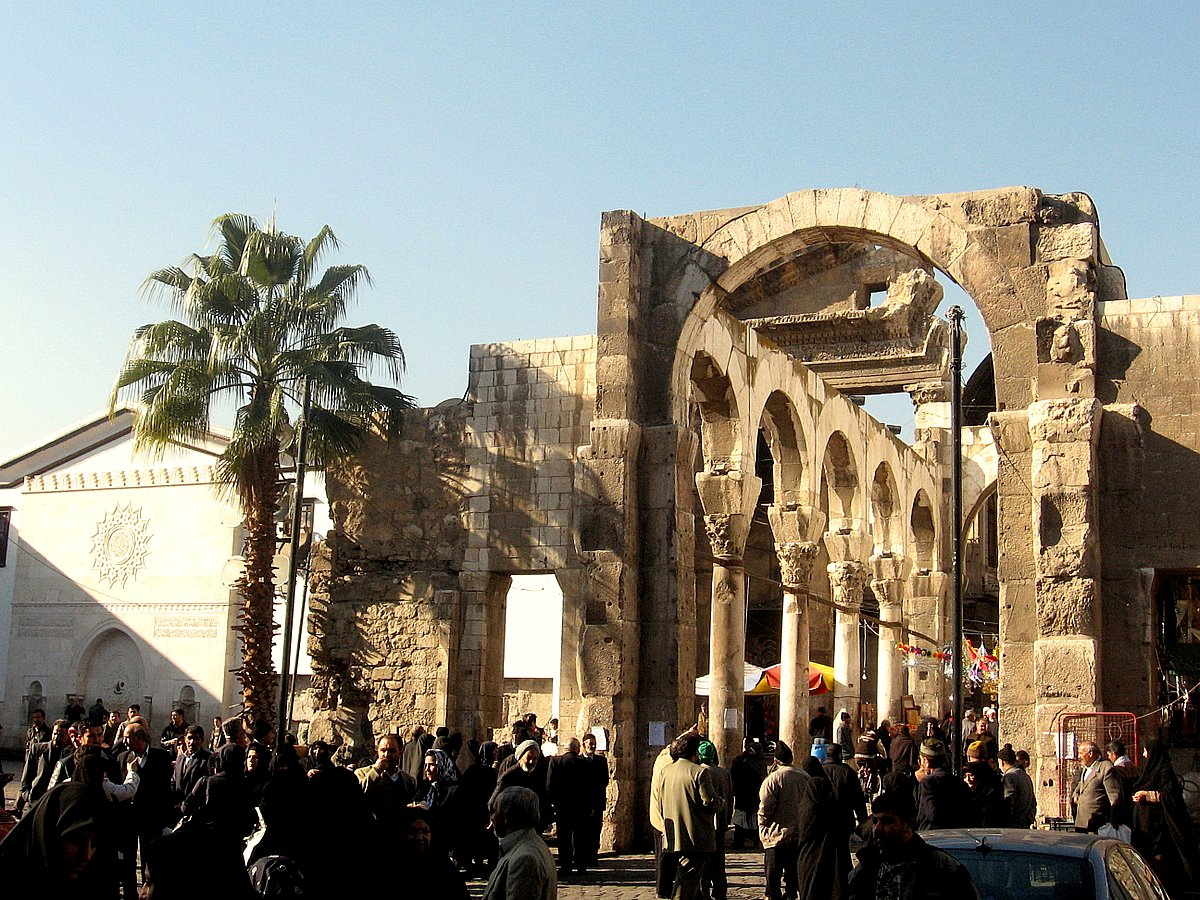
- Remains of the outer western entrance of the temple (near Al-Hamidiyah Souq today)

- Location within Syria
- Type: Temple
- Cultures: Roman
- Location: Damascus, Syria

History
- Built: Between the 1st century BCE and the 4th century CE

Site notes
- Material: Stone
- Condition: Archway and columns remain
- Owner: Public
- Public access: Public

The Temple of Jupiter in Damascus was built by the Romans, beginning during the rule of Augustus in the first century AD and with further works occurring at various times up until the rule of Constantius II. It was developed from an earlier temple on the same site that was dedicated to the god Hadad-Ramman and to its Greek equivalent, Zeus. It was later converted into a church in the 4th century and then into the present-day Umayyad Mosque in the 8th century.

== History ==
=== Aramaean temple of Hadad-Ramman ===
Damascus was the capital of the Aramaean state Aram-Damascus during the Iron Age. The Arameans of western Syria followed the cult of Hadad-Ramman, the god of thunderstorms and rain, and erected a temple dedicated to him at the site of the present-day Umayyad Mosque. It is not known exactly how the temple looked, but it is believed to have followed the traditional Semitic-Canaanite architectural form, resembling the Temple of Jerusalem. The site likely consisted of a walled courtyard, a small chamber for worship, and a tower-like structure typically symbolizing the "high place" of storm gods, in this case Hadad. One stone remains from the Aramaean temple, dated to the rule of King Hazael, is currently on display in the National Museum of Damascus.

=== Greek temple of Zeus ===
Damascus and its region were conquered by the forces of Alexander the Great circa 332 BC. After Alexander's death, it came under the control of the Seleucid successor state. Under the later Seleucid king Antiochus IV (r. 175 – 164 BC), efforts were made to Hellenize the kingdom and promote the cult of Zeus, who was assimilated to the local Semitic god Haddad. Accordingly, the Temple of Haddad was redeveloped around this time into a temple dedicated to Zeus (or Zeus-Haddad). The Hellenistic temple was given a more monumental approach but essentially retained the traditional plan of the older temple.

=== Roman temple of Jupiter ===
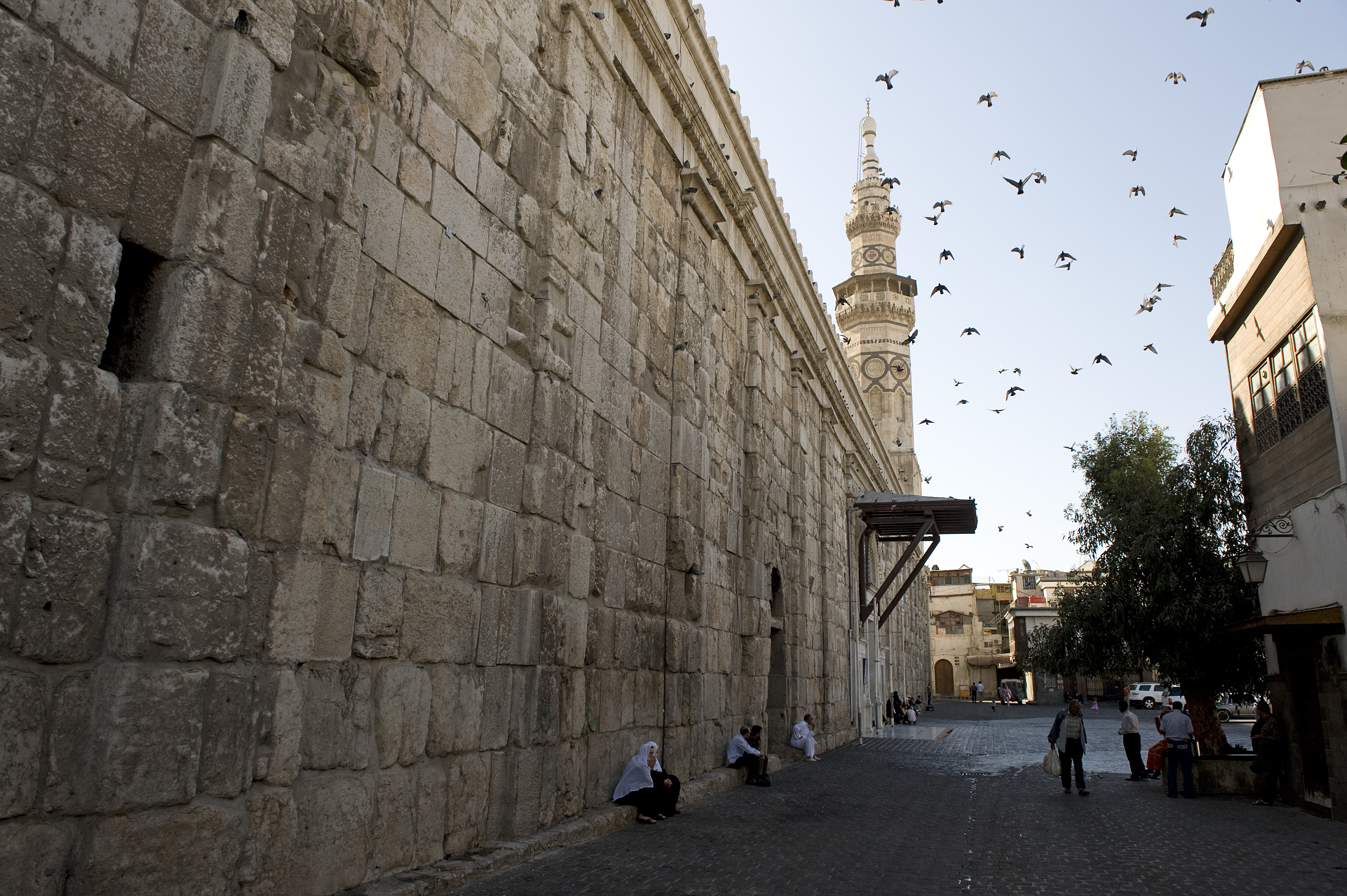
Western wall of the Roman temple's inner enclosure (temenos), now part of the present-day mosque

The temple continued to serve a central role in the city after the Romans conquered Damascus in 64 BCE. The Romans in turn assimilated Hadad and Zeus to their own god of thunder, Jupiter. They began to redevelop and expand the temple in Damascus in the first century AD. Scholar Maamoun Abdulkarim has attributed the design of the temple to Damascus-born architect Apollodorus, who lived from 60 to 130 AD.

The symmetry and dimensions of the new Greco-Roman Temple of Jupiter impressed the local population. It consisted of two concentric walled enclosures: an outer peribolos containing an inner temenos. In the center of the courtyard stood the cella, an image of the god which followers would honor. The main entrance was on the east side, approached via a colonnaded street, the via sacra, connecting the temple to the traditional Greek agora. Some remains of the original colonnade can still be found along present-day al-Qaymariye street, while some remains of the monumental eastern gateway of the peribolos are also still preserved. This led in turn to another monumental gateway on the eastern side of the temenos, fronted by an entablature supported by columns and featuring a central arch. There was one tower at each of the four corners of the temenos. The towers were used for rituals in line with ancient Semitic religious traditions where sacrifices were made on high places.

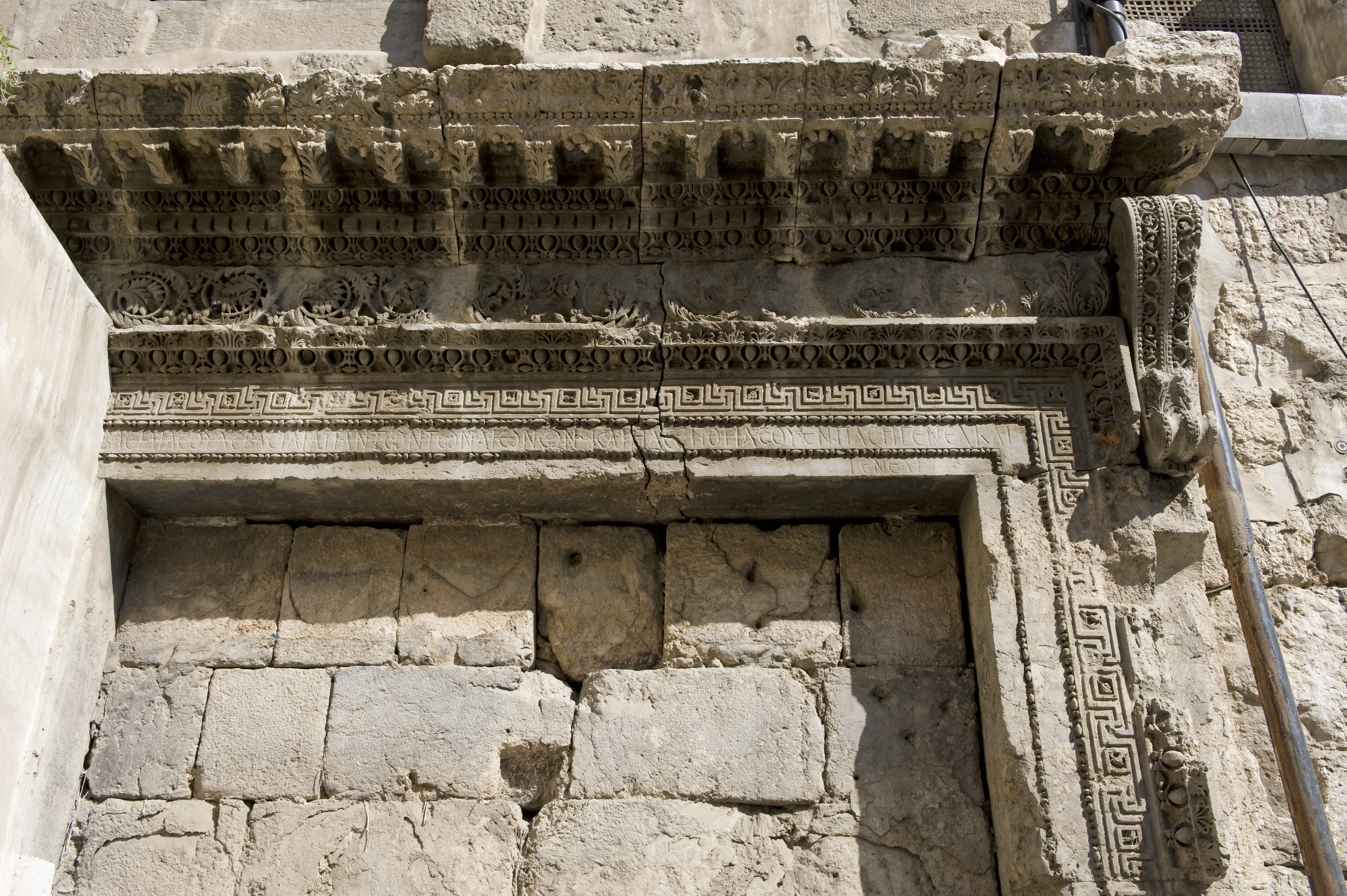
Remains of an old Roman-era triple doorway in the exterior southern wall of the present-day mosque

The sheer size of the compound suggests that the religious hierarchy of the temple, sponsored by the Romans, wielded major influence in the city's affairs. The Roman temple, which later became the center of the Imperial cult of Jupiter, was intended to serve as a response to the Jewish temple in Jerusalem. Instead of being dedicated to one god, the Roman temple combined (interpretatio graeca) all of the gods affiliated with heaven that were worshipped in the region such as Hadad, Ba'al-Shamin and Dushara, into the "supreme-heavenly-astral Zeus". The Temple of Jupiter would attain further additions during the early period of Roman rule of the city, mostly initiated by contributions from individuals. The inner court, or temenos is believed to have been completed soon after the end of Augustus' reign in 14 CE. This was surrounded by an outer court, or peribolos which included a market, and was built in stages as funds permitted, and completed in the middle of the first century CE. At this time the eastern gateway or propylaeum was first built. This temple was refurbished with more extensive decoration during the reign of Septimius Severus (r. 193–211 CE). Part of the propylaeum at the western entrance of the temple still stands today.

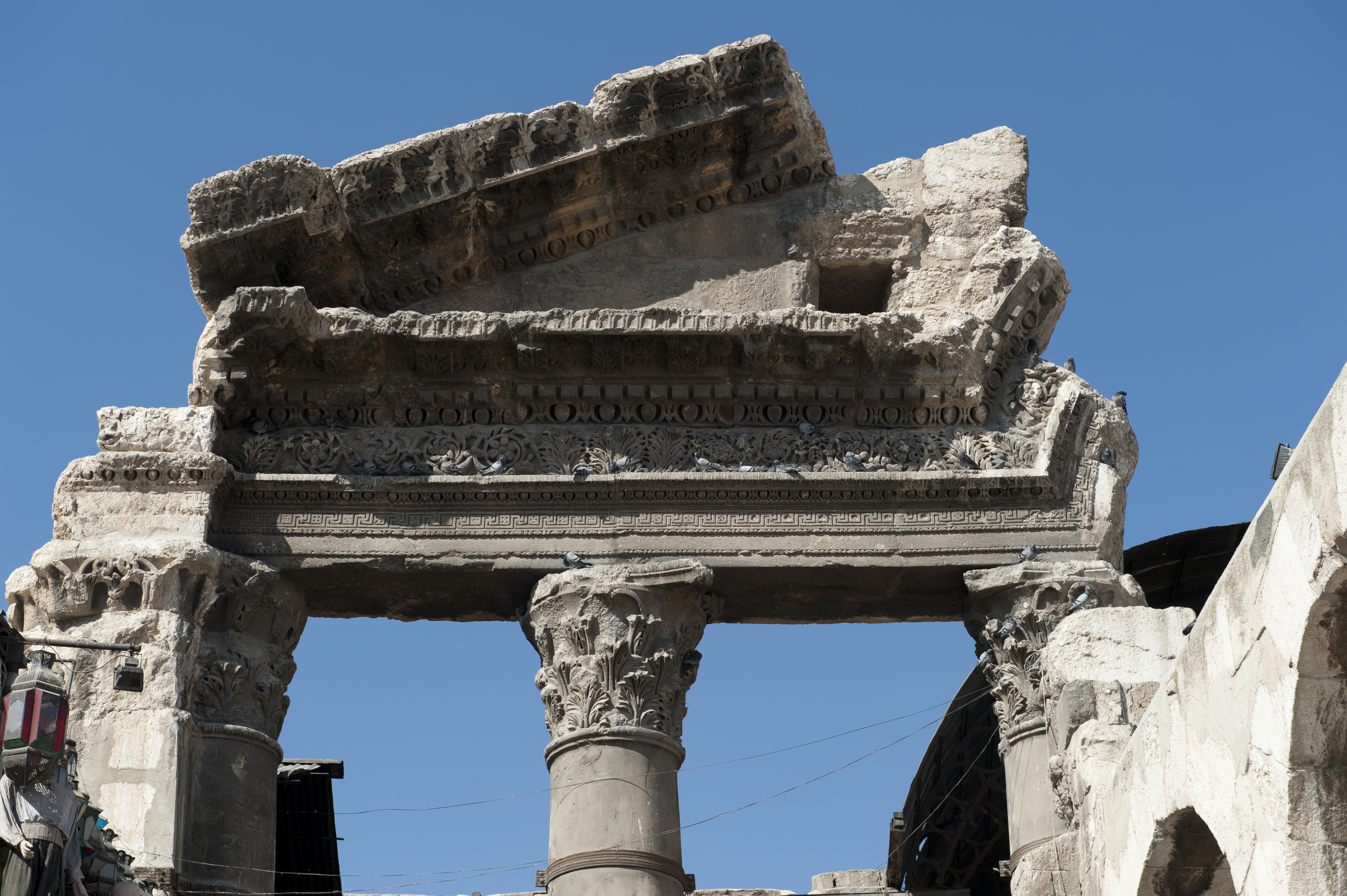
Remains of the decorated propylaeum at the western entrance of the outer enclosure (peribolos) of the Roman temple, likely dating to the works of Septimius Severus (2nd century AD)

By the 4th century CE, the temple was especially renowned for its size and beauty. It was separated from the city by two sets of walls. The first, wider wall spanned a wide area that included a market, and the second wall surrounded the actual sanctuary of Jupiter. It was the largest temple in Roman Syria.

=== Later history ===
During the Persecution of pagans in the late Roman Empire, Theodosius I converted the temple to a church dedicated to John the Baptist. After the Muslims took over Damascus in 635 CE, the church was shared for seventy years, but Al-Walid I converted it to the Umayyad Mosque.

== Archaeology and interpretation ==
Richard Pococke published a plan of the temple compound in 1745 in his work A Description of the East and Some other Countries, Vol. II. In 1855, the Reverend Josias Porter published a plan showing 40 surviving columns or column fragments which still survived between houses in the area. In 1921, Wulzinger and Watzinger made a plan showing the peribolos to measure some 350m by 450m.

== See also ==
- List of Ancient Roman temples

== Bibliography ==
- Burns, Ross (2005), Damascus: A History, London: Routledge, ISBN 0-415-27105-3.
- Burns, Ross (2009) [1992]. The Monuments of Syria: A Guide. I.B. Tauris. ISBN 9781845119478.
- Bowersock, Glen Warren; Brown, Peter Lamont (2001). Interpreting late antiquity: essays on the postclassical world. Harvard University Press. ISBN 0-674-00598-8.
- Finegan, Jack (1981). The archeology of the New Testament:the Mediterranean world of the early Christian Apostles. Taylor & Francis. ISBN 9780709910060.
- Abdulkarim, Maamoun (2003). "Syria in the times of Apollodorus of Damascus". In Calcani, Giuliana (ed.). Apollodorus of Damascus and Trajan's Column: from tradition to project. L'Erma di Bretschneider. ISBN 88-8265-233-5.
