= Umayyad Mosque =

Mosque in Damascus, Syria

- ٱلْجَامِع ٱلْأُمَوِي
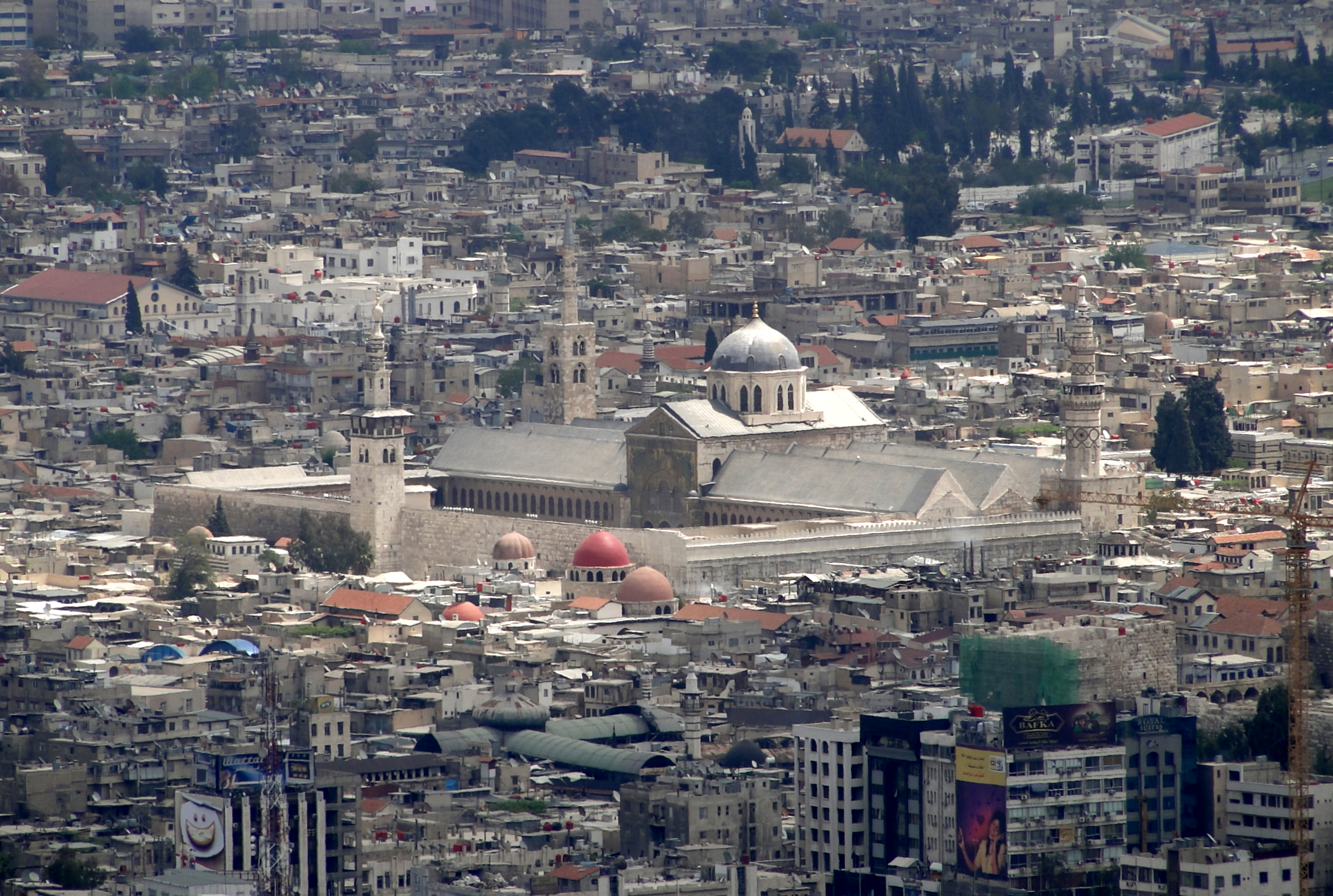
- Aerial view of the Umayyad Mosque within the Old City of Damascus

Religion
- Affiliation: Sunni Islam
- Status: Active

Location
- Location: Damascus, Damascus Governorate
- Country: Syria
- Interactive map of Umayyad Mosque
- Coordinates: 33°30′41″N 36°18′24″E

Architecture
- Type: Mosque
- Style: Umayyad
- Founder: Al-Walid ibn Abd al-Malik
- Completed: 715 CE

Specifications
- Minaret: 3
- Minaret height: 77 m (253 ft)
- Materials: Stone, marble, tile, mosaic

UNESCO World Heritage Site
- Official name: Ancient City of Damascus
- Type: Cultural
- Criteria: i, ii, iii, iv, vi
- Designated: 1979 (3rd session)
- Reference no.: 20
- Region: Arab States

The Umayyad Mosque (Arabic: ٱلْجَامِع ٱلْأُمَوِي, romanized: al-Jāmiʿ al-Umawī), also known as the Great Mosque of Damascus (Arabic: جَامِع بَنِي أُمَيَّة ٱلْكَبِيْر, romanized: Jāmiʿ Banī Umayyah al-Kabīr), located in the old city of Damascus, the capital of Syria, is one of the largest and oldest mosques in the world. It is considered to be the oldest mosque still in use in its original form. It innovated and influenced nascent Islamic architecture by introducing a more organized and monumental design compared to earlier mosques. It enjoyed great prestige throughout its history and was regarded as a "wonder of the world" by many medieval Muslim writers. Although the original structure has been altered several times due to fire, war damage, and repairs, it is one of the few mosques to maintain the same form and architectural features of its 8th-century construction, as well as its Umayyad character. The plan of the mosque with its courtyard surrounded by riwaqs and a covered praying area is based on the original plan of the Prophet's Mosque in Medina, which was itself reconstructed and expanded under the Umayyads in 707 AD.

The site has been used as a house of worship since the Iron Age, when the Arameans built on it a temple dedicated to their god of rain, Hadad. It was later associated with the Greek god Zeus during the Hellenistic period. Under Roman rule after 64 CE, it was converted into the center of the imperial cult of Jupiter, the Roman god of rain, becoming one of the largest temples in Syria. The current walls of the mosque were the inner walls of the Temple of Jupiter (built in the 1st century BC to 4th century AD).

When the empire in Syria transitioned to Christian Byzantine rule, Emperor Theodosius I (r. 379–395) transformed it into a cathedral, and the seat of the second-highest-ranking bishop in the Patriarchate of Antioch. After the Muslim conquest of Damascus in 634, part of the cathedral was designated as a small prayer house (musalla) for the Muslim conquerors, with the partition being divided into east and west sides. As the Muslim community grew, the Umayyad caliph al-Walid I (r. 705–715) confiscated the rest of the cathedral for Muslim use, returning to the Christians other properties in the city as compensation.

The chapel structure was demolished and a grand congregational mosque complex was built in its place. The new structure was built over nine years by thousands of laborers and artisans from across the Islamic and Byzantine empires at considerable expense and was funded by the war booty of Umayyad conquests and taxes on the Arab troops of Damascus. Unlike the simpler mosques of the time, the Umayyad Mosque had a large basilical plan with three parallel aisles and a perpendicular central nave leading from the mosque's entrance to the world's second concave mihrab (prayer niche). The mosque was noted for its rich compositions of marble paneling and its extensive gold mosaics of vegetal motifs, covering some 4,000 square metres (43,000 ft^{2}), likely the largest in the world. Under Abbasid rule (750–860), new structures were added, including the Dome of the Treasury and the Minaret of the Bride, while the Mamluks (1260–1516) undertook major restoration efforts and added the Minaret of Qaitbay.

Its religious importance stems from the eschatological reports concerning the mosque and historic events associated with it. Christian and Muslim tradition alike consider it the burial place of John the Baptist's head, a tradition originating in the 6th century. Two shrines inside the premises commemorate the Islamic prophet Muhammad's grandson Husayn ibn Ali, whose martyrdom is frequently compared to that of John the Baptist. Its eastern Minaret of Isa is traditionally identified as the place from which Isa (Jesus) will descend from heaven, based on interpretations of the Islamic Hadith.

== History ==
=== Pre-Islamic period ===
The site of the Umayyad Mosque is attested as a place of worship since the Iron Age. Damascus was the capital of the Aramaean state Aram-Damascus and a large temple was dedicated to Hadad-Ramman, the god of thunderstorms and rain, and was erected at the site of the present-day mosque. One stone remains from the Aramaean temple, dated to the rule of King Hazael, and is currently on display in the National Museum of Damascus.

The Temple of Hadad-Ramman continued to serve a central role in the city afterwards. Under the rule of the Seleucids in the Hellenistic period, probably in the 2nd century BC, the temple was formally dedicated to the Greek god Zeus, who was assimilated with Haddad-Ramman. After the Roman Empire conquered Damascus in 64 BC, they introduced worship of the equivalent Roman god, Jupiter. Thus, they engaged in a project to reconfigure and expand the temple, probably beginning in the reign of Augustus (r. 27 BC – 14 AD). The later Damascus-born architect Apollodorus may have been involved in the design.

The new Temple of Jupiter became the center of the imperial cult of Jupiter and was served as a response to the Second Temple in Jerusalem. The Temple of Jupiter would attain further additions during the early Roman period, some funded by contributions from individuals. The temple was further renovated and embellished during the reign of Septimius Severus (r. 193–211). The remains of the western propylaeum visible today most likely date from his time. By the 4th century, the temple was especially renowned for its size and beauty. It was separated from the city by two sets of walls. The first, outer wall spanned a wide area that included a market, and the second inner wall surrounded the actual sanctuary of Jupiter. It was the largest temple in Roman Syria.

In 391, the Temple of Jupiter was converted into a cathedral by the Christian emperor Theodosius I (r. 379–395). The church was likely one of the largest of the time. It served as the seat of the Bishop of Damascus, who ranked second within the Patriarchate of Antioch after the patriarch himself.

=== Umayyad construction ===
==== Foundation and construction ====
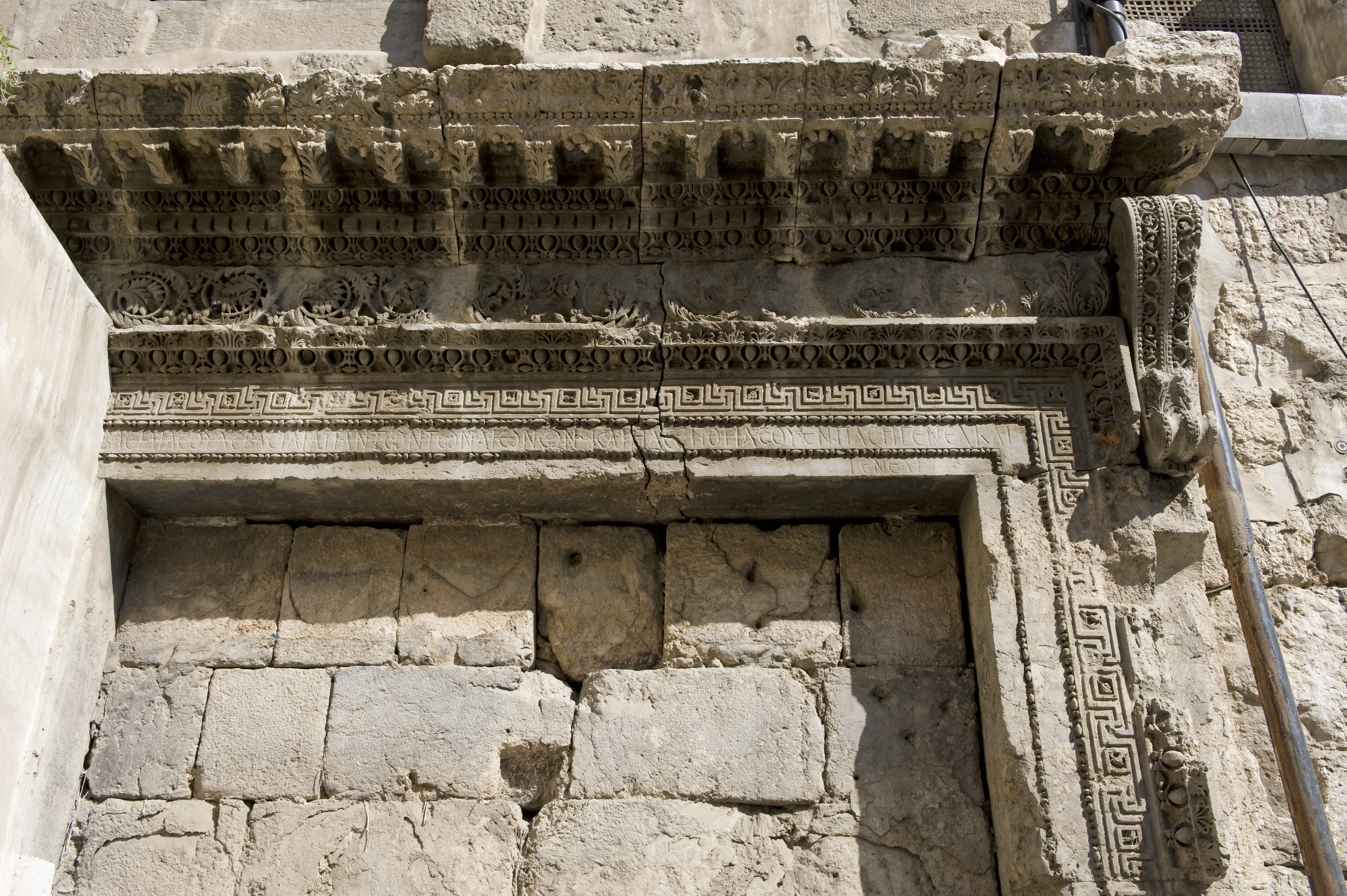
Remains of an old Roman-era triple doorway in the exterior southern wall of the mosque

Damascus was captured by Muslim Arab forces led by Khalid ibn al-Walid in 634. In 661, the Islamic Caliphate came under the rule of the Umayyad dynasty, which chose Damascus to be the administrative capital of the Muslim world. The Byzantine cathedral had remained in use by the local Christians, but a prayer room (musalla) for Muslims was constructed on the southeastern part of the building. The musalla did not have the capacity to house the rapidly growing number of Muslim worshippers in Damascus. The city otherwise lacked sufficient free space for a large congregational mosque. The sixth Umayyad caliph, al-Walid I (r. 705–715), resolved to construct such a mosque on the site of the cathedral in 706. Proclaiming:

Inhabitants of Damascus, four things give you marked superiority over the rest of the world: your climate, your water, your fruits, and your baths. To these I wanted to add a fifth: this mosque.”

Al-Walid personally supervised the project and had most of the cathedral, including the musalla, demolished. The construction of the mosque completely altered the layout of the building, though it preserved the outer walls of the temenos (sanctuary or inner enclosure) of the Roman-era temple. While the church (and the temples before it) had the main building located at the centre of the rectangular enclosure, the mosque's prayer hall is placed against its south wall. The architect recycled the columns and arcades of the church, dismantling and repositioning them in the new structure. Besides its use as a large congregational mosque for the Damascenes, the new house of worship was meant as a tribute to the city.

Façade of the prayer hall

In response to Christian protest at the move, al-Walid ordered all the other confiscated churches in the city to be returned to the Christians as compensation. The mosque was completed in 711, or in 715, shortly after al-Walid's death, by his successor, Sulayman ibn Abd al-Malik (r. 715–717). According to 10th-century Persian historian Ibn al-Faqih, somewhere between 600,000 and 1,000,000 gold dinars were spent on the project. The historian Khalid Yahya Blankinship notes that the field army of Damascus, numbering some 45,000 soldiers, were taxed a quarter of their salaries for nine years to pay for its construction. Coptic (Egyptian) craftsmen as well as Persian, Indian, Greek, and Maghrebi laborers provided the bulk of the labour force which consisted of 12,000 people. The extravagant costs also attracted initial resentment among the population and criticism from some Muslim writers.

The mosque subsequently held major religious and cultural significance throughout its history, while also having a strong influence on later Islamic architecture. It was commonly regarded as one of the "wonders of the world" by medieval Muslim authors, who praised its architecture and decoration. Some medieval authors even claim that of the five wonders the mosque ranks fourth for its superlative beauty and extraordinary cost while its decoration ranks fifth.

==== Layout design ====
Floor plan of the mosque (today), with the courtyard above and the three-aisled prayer hall below

The plan of the new mosque was innovative and highly influential in the history of early Islamic architecture. The earliest mosques before this had been relatively plain hypostyle structures (a flat-roof hall supported by columns), of which the Prophet's Mosque in Medina was an important model. The new mosque in Damascus introduced a more basilical plan to this model, with three parallel aisles and a perpendicular central nave. The central nave, which leads from the main entrance to the mihrab (niche in the qibla wall) and features a central dome, provided a new aesthetic focus which may have been designed to emphasize the area originally reserved for the caliph during prayers, near the mihrab. There is some uncertainty as to whether the dome was originally directly in front of the mihrab (as in many later mosques) or in its current position mid-way along the central nave. Scholars have attributed the design of the mosque's plan to the influences of Byzantine Christian basilicas in the region. Rafi Grafman and Myriam Rosen-Ayalon have argued that the first Umayyad Al-Aqsa Mosque built in Jerusalem, begun by Abd al-Malik (al-Walid's father) and now replaced by later constructions, had a layout very similar to the current Umayyad Mosque in Damascus and that it probably served as a model for the latter.

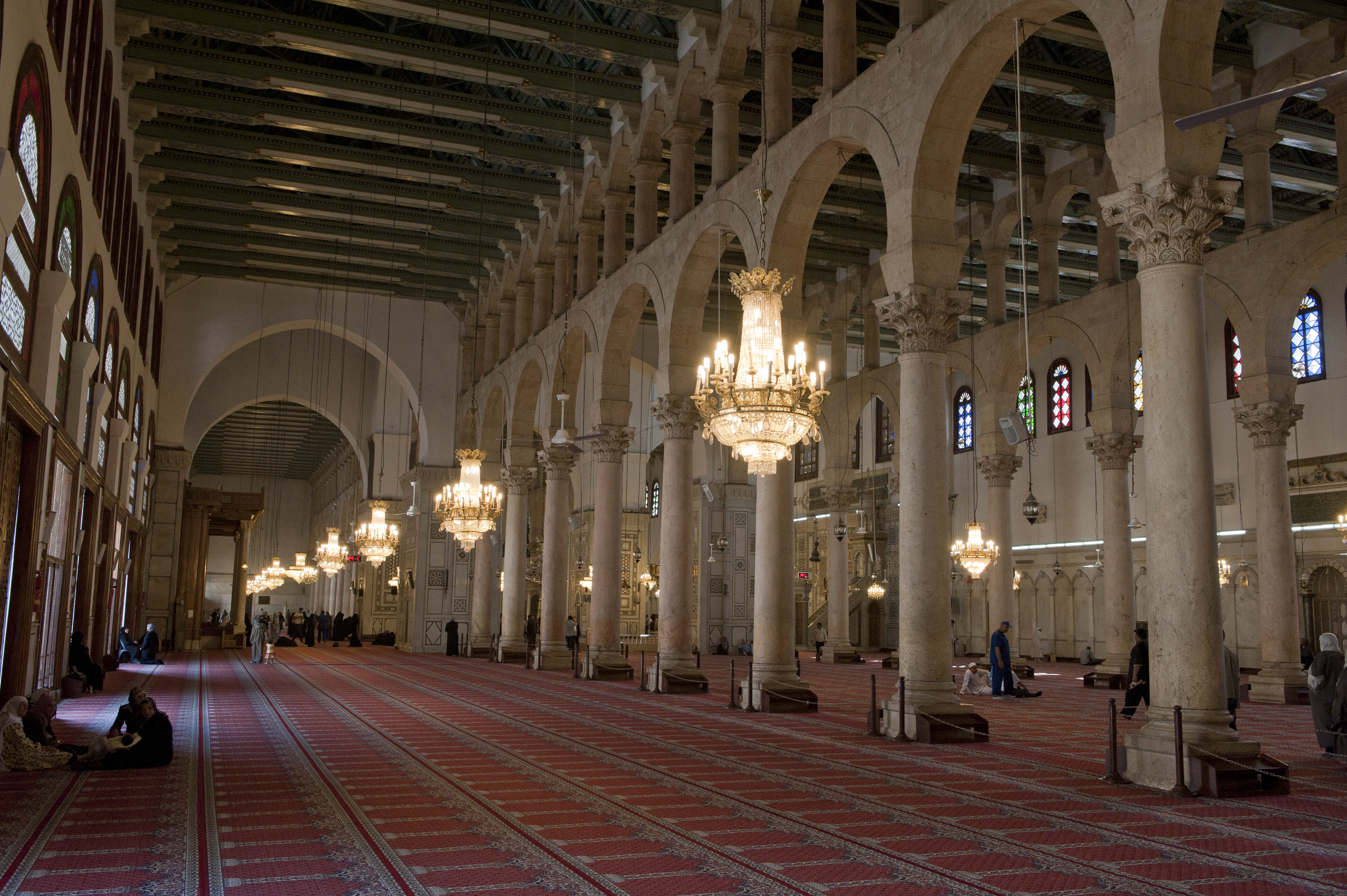
Interior of the prayer hall

The mosque initially had no minaret towers, as this feature of mosque architecture was not established until later. However, at least two of the corners of the mosque's outer wall had short towers, platforms, or roof shelters which were used by the muezzin to issue the call to prayer (adhān), constituting a type of proto-minaret. These features were referred to as a mi'd͟hana ("place of the adhān") or as a ṣawma῾a ("monk's cell", due to their small size) in historical Arabic sources. Arabic sources indicated that they were former Roman towers which already stood at the corners of the temenos before the mosque's construction and were simply left intact and reused after construction.

==== Decoration ====
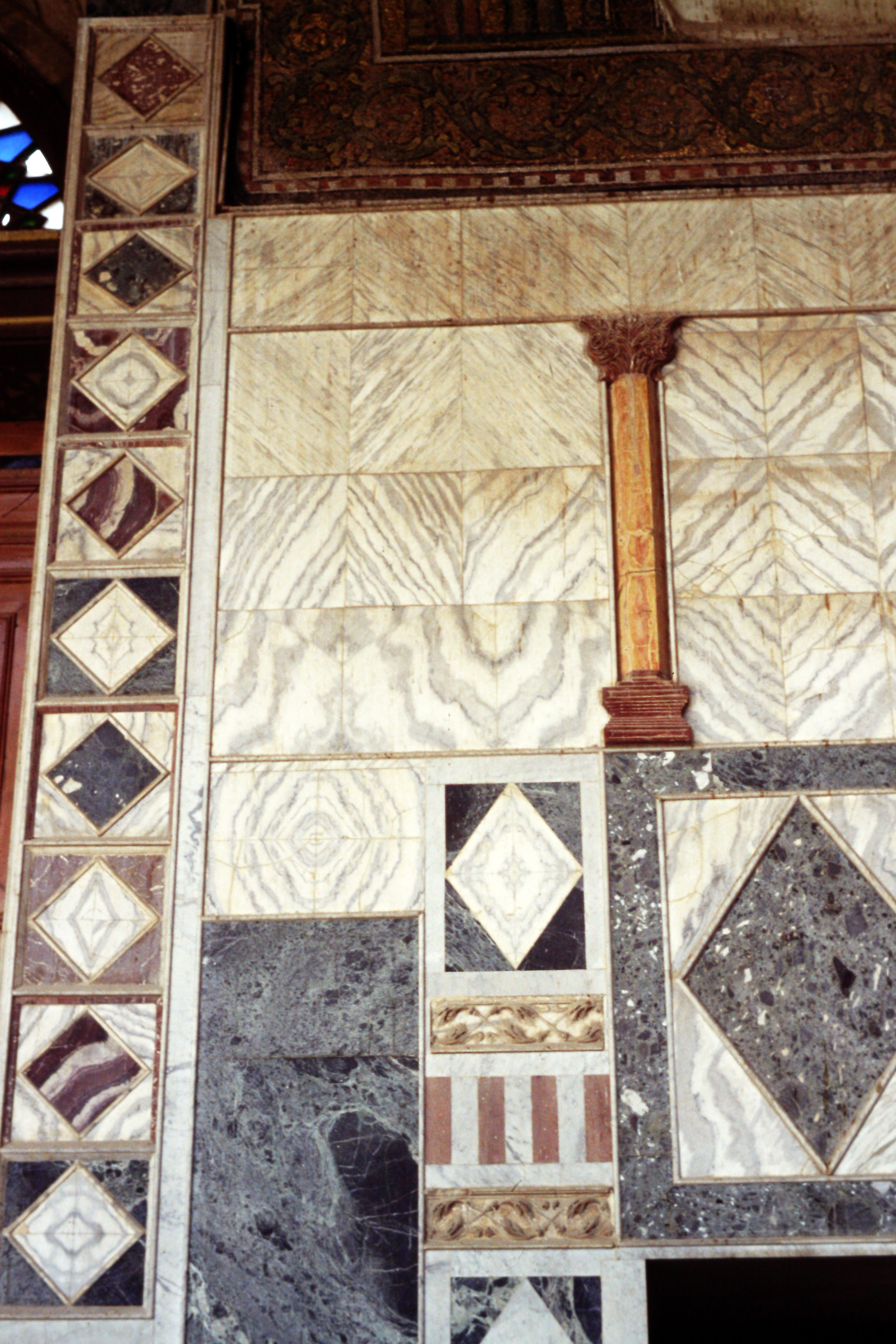
Remnants of original marble paneling around the inside of Bab Jairun, the east gate of the mosque

The mosque was richly decorated. A rich composition of marble paneling covered the lower walls, though only minor examples of the original marbles have survived today near the east gate. The walls of the prayer hall were raised above the level of the old temenos walls, which allowed for new windows to be inserted in the upper walls. The windows had ornately carved grilles that foreshadowed the styles of windows in later Islamic architecture.

The most celebrated decorative element of all was the revetment of mosaics, which originally covered much of the courtyard and the interior hall. The best-preserved remains are still visible in the courtyard today. (Note: The best-preserved sections of the mosaics today are located on the inner and outer facades of the western portico (arches) of the courtyard, as well as in the vestibule of the western entrance. Restitutions carried out to other sections after 1963 have been heavily criticized for their inauthenticity. Areas of original mosaic work generally appear darker today than areas of new (restored) mosaics. A large stretch of mosaics along the inner wall of the western portico, sometimes known as the "Barada panel", contains original Umayyad fragments, late 13th-century fragments from the time of the Mamluk sultan Baybars, and post-1963 restorations. The outer façade of the prayer hall's main entrance contains only limited fragments of original mosaic (in darker shades), with the rest restored after 1963. Some damaged remains of mosaics on the interior façade of this entrance, inside the prayer hall, date from a late 11th-century Seljuk-era restoration.)

By some estimates, the original mosque had the largest area of gold mosaics in the world, covering approximately 4,000 square metres (43,000 ft^{2}). The mosaics depict landscapes and buildings in a characteristic late Roman style. They reflected a wide variety of artistic styles used by mosaicists and painters since the 1st century CE, but the combined use of all these different styles in the same place was innovative at the time. Similar to the Dome of the Rock, built earlier by Abd al-Malik, vegetation and plants were the most common motif, but those of the Damascus mosque are more naturalistic. In addition to the large landscape depictions, a mosaic frieze with an intricate vine motif (referred to as the karma in Arabic historical sources) once ran around the walls of the prayer hall, above the level of the mihrab. The only notable omission is the absence of human and animal figures, which was likely a new restriction imposed by the Muslim patron.

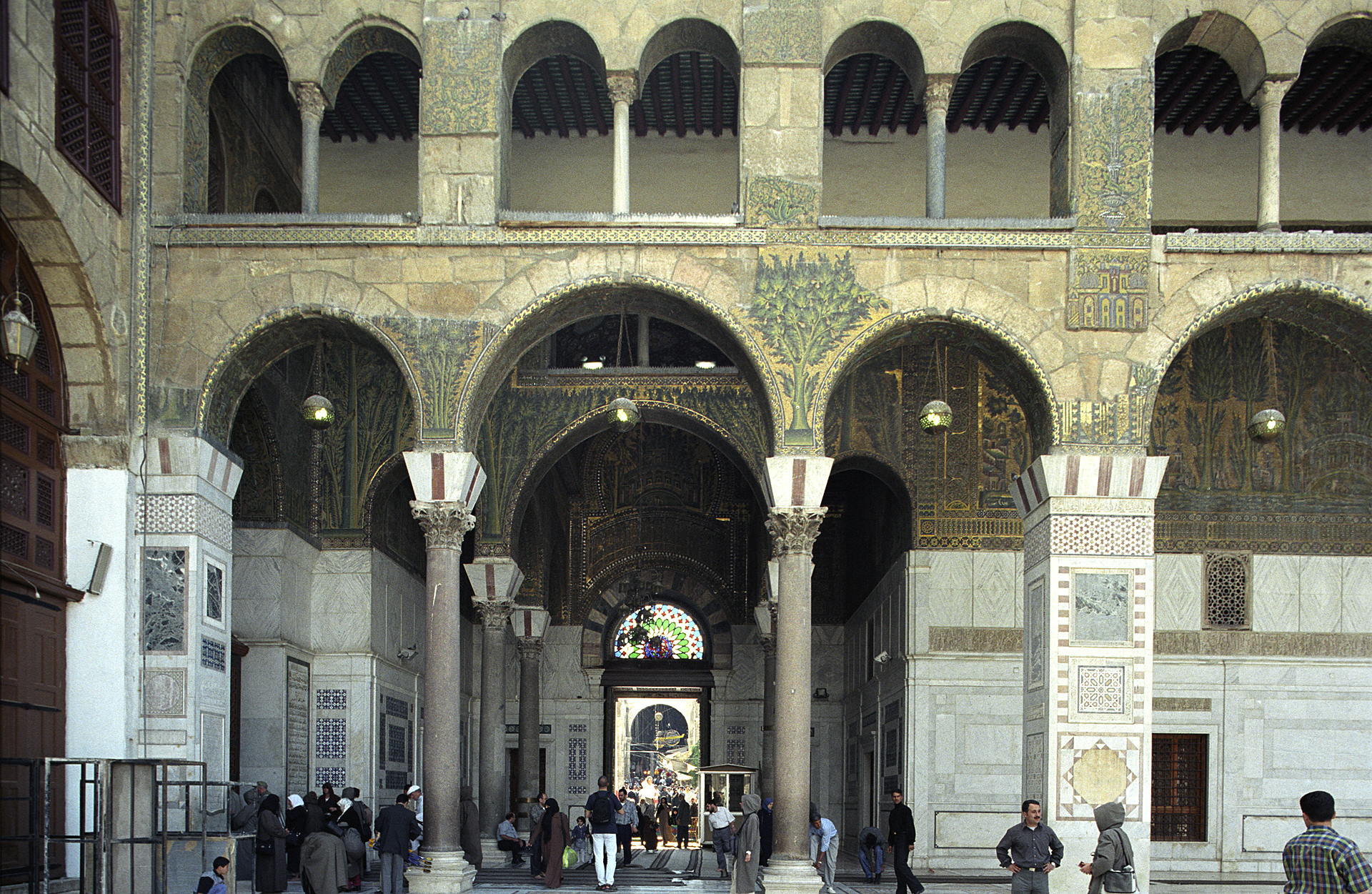
Western portico of the courtyard, with partial remains of mosaic decoration

Historical Arabic sources, often written in later centuries, suggest that both the craftsmen and the materials employed to create the mosque's mosaics were imported from the Byzantine capital of Constantinople. The 12th-century historian Ibn Asakir claimed that al-Walid pressured the Byzantine emperor into sending him 200 craftsmen by threatening to destroy all churches inside Umayyad territory if he refused. Many scholars, based on such evidence from Arabic sources, have accepted a Byzantine (Constantinopolitan) origin for the mosaics, while some, such as Creswell, have interpreted the story as a later embellishment of Muslim historians with a symbolic political significance.

Art historian Finbarr Barry Flood notes that historical sources report many other apparent gifts of artisans and materials from the Byzantine emperors to the Umayyad caliphs and other rulers, probably reflecting a widespread admiration for Byzantine craftsmanship that continued in the early Islamic period. He notes that while Byzantine influence is indeed apparent in the mosque's mosaic imagery, there are multiple ways in which Byzantine mosaicists could have contributed to its production, including a collaboration with local craftsmen. Some scholars argue that the mosaic techniques in both the Dome of the Rock and the Umayyad Mosque, including their distinctive colour scheme, are more clearly consistent with the craftsmanship of Syro-Palestinian or Egyptian mosaicists. Archeologist Judith McKenzie suggests that the mosaics could have been designed by local artisans who oversaw their production, while any mosaicists sent from Constantinople could have been working under their supervision. A recent 2022 study of the chemical composition of mosaic tesserae in the Umayyad Mosque concluded that the majority were produced in Egypt around the time of the mosque's construction, matching other recent studies of samples from the Dome of the Rock and Khirbat al-Majfar that came to the same conclusion.

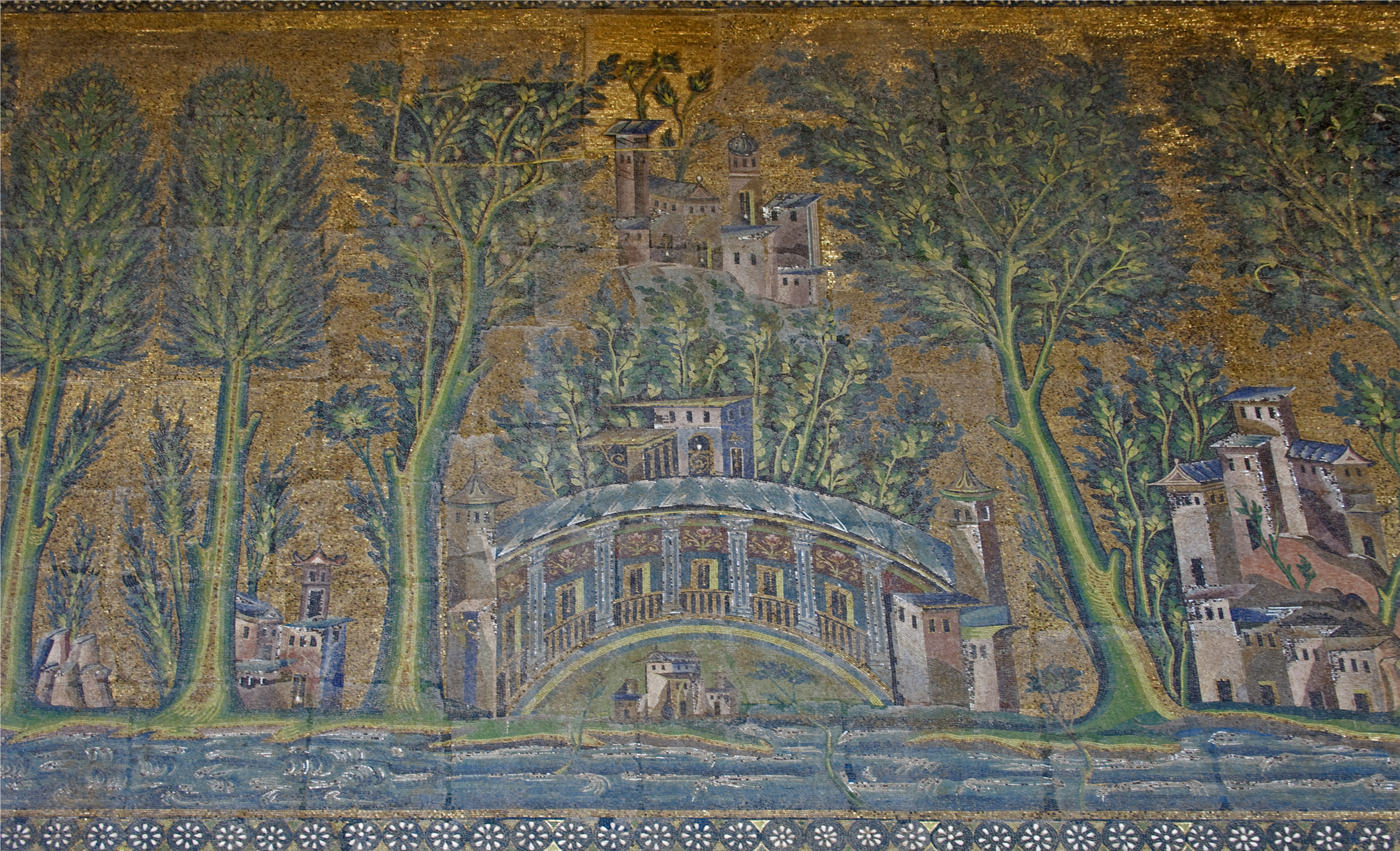
Portion of the so-called "Barada Panel" behind the western portico, with remains of original Umayyad mosaics, depicting landscapes and buildings

Scholars have long debated the meaning of the mosaic imagery. Some historical Muslim writers and some modern scholars have interpreted them as a topographical representation of all the cities in the known world (or within the Umayyad world), some have interpreted them as a representation of Damascus itself and the Barada River, and other scholars interpret them as a depiction of Paradise. The earliest known interpretation of the mosaics is by the 10th-century geographer al-Muqaddasi, who suggested a topographical meaning, commenting that "there is hardly a tree or a notable town that has not been pictured on these walls." An early example of the Paradise interpretation dates from the writings of Ibn al-Najjar in the 12th century. This interpretation has been favoured by more recent scholarship. Some of the Qur'anic inscriptions that were originally present on the qibla wall of the mosque, mentioning the Day of Judgment and promising the reward of a heavenly garden (al-janna), may support this interpretation. Another clue is an account by historian Ibn Zabala in 814, which reports that one of the mosaicists who worked for al-Walid's reconstruction of the Prophet's Mosque in Medina (contemporary with the construction in Damascus) directly explained the mosaics there as a reproduction of the trees and palaces of Paradise, which suggests that the contemporary Umayyad mosaics in Damascus had the same intention.

In this interpretation, the lack of human figures in these scenes possibly represents a Paradise that stands empty until the arrival of its human inhabitants at the end of time. Other motifs in the mosaics have been cited to support a paradisal meaning and the imagery has been compared with both the descriptions of Paradise in the Qur'an and the earlier iconography of paradisal imagery in Late Antique art. According to Judith McKenzie, there is a similarity between certain architectural elements depicted in the Umayyad mosaics and those shown in Pompeian frescoes (such as broken pediments and tholoi with tented roofs and Corinthian columns), as well as some early Christian and Byzantine art, which are most likely depictions of the architecture of Hellenistic Alexandria. In Roman and Late Antique art, Alexandrian and Egyptian landscapes had a paradisal connotation. McKenzie argues that the Umayyad mosaics, extending these traditions, can thus be understood as a depiction of Paradise. The possibility also remains that the mosaic scenes combine more than one of these meanings at the same time; for example, by using paradisal imagery to represent Damascus or the Umayyad realm as an idealized, earthly paradise.

==== The mihrab ====
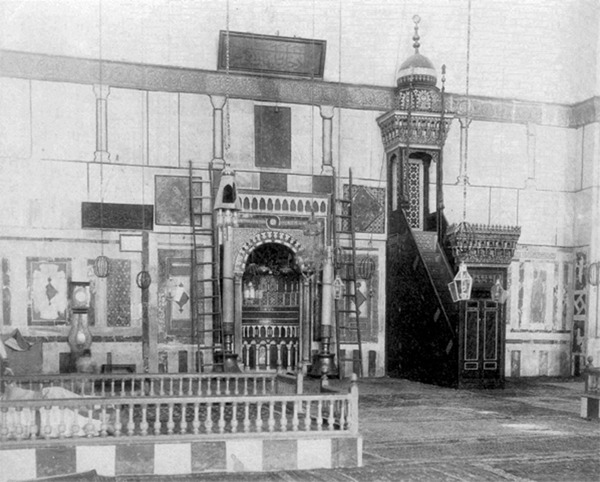
Photograph of the mosque's mihrab (center) and minbar (right) before the 1893 fire

The original mihrab was one of the first concave mihrabs in the Islamic world, the second one known to exist after the one created in 706–707 during al-Walid's reconstruction of the Prophet's Mosque in Medina. The exact appearance of the mosque's original main mihrab is uncertain, due to the multiple repairs and restorations that took place over the centuries. Ibn Jubayr, who visited the mosque in 1184, described the inside of the mihrab as filled with miniature blind arcades whose arches resembled "small mihrabs", each filled with inlaid mother-of-pearl mosaics and framed by spiral columns of marble. This mihrab was famed across the Islamic world for its beauty, as noted by other writers of the era.

Its appearance may have been imitated by other surviving mihrabs built under the Mamluk sultans al-Mansur Qalawun and al-Nasir Muhammad in the 13th and 14th centuries, such as the richly decorated mihrab of Qalawun's mausoleum in Cairo (completed in 1285). Scholars generally assume that the mihrab described by Ibn Jubayr dated from a restoration of the mosque in 1082. Another restoration occurred after 1401 and this version, which survived until another fire in 1893, was again decorated with miniature arcades, while its semi-dome was filled with coffering similar to Roman architecture. Finbarr Barry Flood has suggested that the perpetuation of the mihrab's arcaded decoration across several restorations indicates that the medieval restorations were aimed at preserving at least some of the original mihrab's appearance, and therefore the 8th-century Umayyad mihrab may have had these features.

=== Abbasid and Fatimid era ===
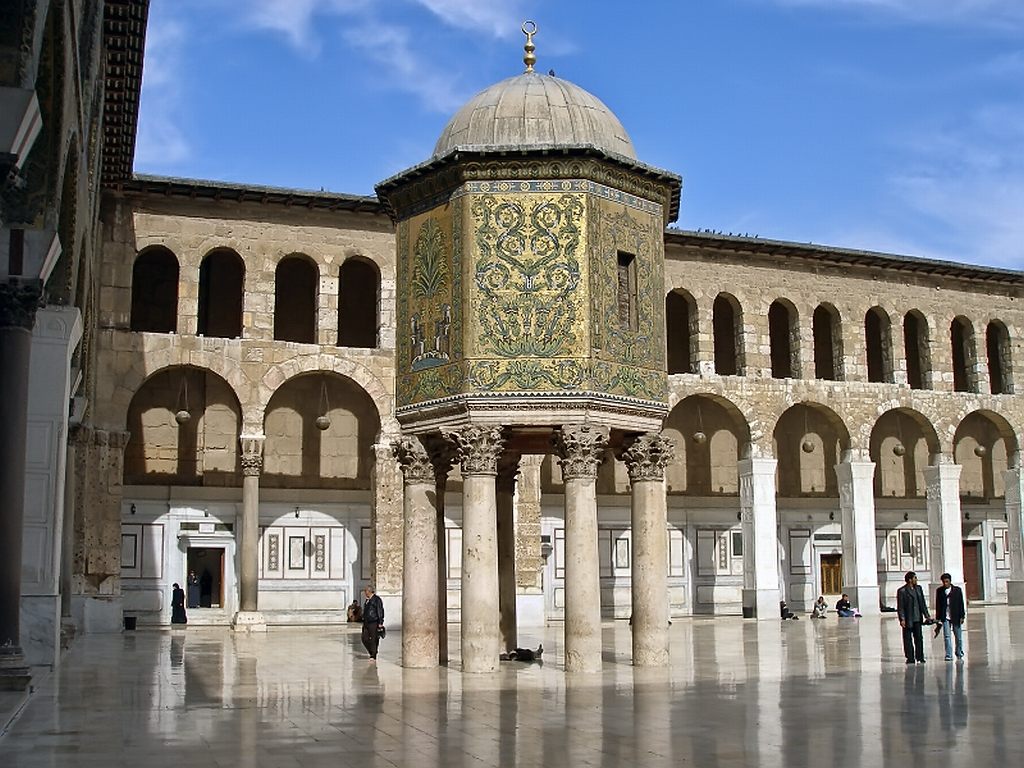
Qubbat Al-Khazna (Dome of the Treasury), built in 789–90

Following the toppling of the Umayyads in 750, the Abbasid dynasty came to power and moved the capital of the Caliphate to Baghdad. Apart from the attention given for strategic and commercial purposes, the Abbasids had no interest in Damascus. Thus, the Umayyad Mosque reportedly suffered under their rule, with little recorded building activity between the 8th and 10th centuries. However, the Abbasids did consider the mosque to be a major symbol of Islam's triumph, and thus it was spared the systematic eradication of the Umayyad legacy in the city. In 789–90 the Abbasid governor of Damascus, al-Fadl ibn Salih ibn Ali, constructed the Dome of the Treasury with the purpose of housing the mosque's funds. The so-called Dome of the Clock, standing in the eastern part of the courtyard, may have also been erected originally by the same Abbasid governor in 780. The 10th-century Jerusalemite geographer al-Muqaddasi credited the Abbasids for building the northern minaret (Madhanat al-Arous, meaning 'Minaret of the Bride') of the mosque in 831 during the reign of Caliph al-Ma'mun (r. 813–833). This was accompanied by al-Ma'mun's removal and replacement of Umayyad inscriptions in the mosque.

By the early 10th century, a monumental water clock had been installed by the entrance in the western part of the southern wall of the mosque, which was consequently known as Bab al-Sa'a ('Gate of the Clock') at the time but is known today as Bab al-Ziyada. This clock seems to have stopped functioning by the middle of the 12th century. Abbasid rule over Syria began crumbling during the early 10th century, and in the decades that followed, it came under the control of autonomous realms who were only nominally under Abbasid authority. The Fatimids of Egypt, who adhered to Shia Islam, conquered Damascus in 970, but few recorded improvements of the mosque were undertaken by the new rulers. The Umayyad Mosque's prestige allowed the residents of Damascus to establish the city as a center for Sunni intellectualism, enabling them to maintain relative independence from Fatimid religious authority. In 1069, large sections of the mosque, particularly the northern wall, were destroyed in a fire as a result of an uprising by the city's residents against the Fatimids' Berber army who were garrisoned there.

=== Seljuk and Ayyubid era ===
The Sunni Muslim Seljuk Turks gained control of the city in 1078 and restored the nominal rule of the Abbasid Caliphate. The Seljuk ruler Tutush (r. 1079–1095) initiated the repair of damage caused by the 1069 fire. In 1082, his vizier, Abu Nasr Ahmad ibn Fadl, had the central dome restored in a more spectacular form; the two piers supporting it were reinforced and the original Umayyad mosaics of the northern inner façade were renewed. The northern riwaq ('portico') was rebuilt in 1089. The Seljuk atabeg of Damascus, Toghtekin (r. 1104–1128), repaired the northern wall in 1110 and two inscribed panels located above its doorways were dedicated to him. In 1113, the Seljuk atabeg of Mosul, Sharaf al-Din Mawdud (r. 1109–1113), was assassinated in the Umayyad Mosque. As the conflict between Damascus and the Crusaders intensified in the mid-12th century, the mosque was used as a principal rallying point calling on Muslims to defend the city and return Jerusalem to Muslim hands. Prominent imams, including Ibn Asakir, preached a spiritual jihad ('struggle') and when the Crusaders advanced towards Damascus in 1148, the city's residents heeded their calls; the Crusader army withdrew as a result of their resistance.

In Damascus there is a mosque that has no equal in the world, not one with such fine proportion, nor one so solidly constructed, nor one vaulted so securely, nor one more marvelously laid out, nor one so admirably decorated in gold mosaics and diverse designs, with enameled tiles and polished marbles.

— Muhammad al-Idrisi, 1154

During the reign of the Zengid ruler Nur ad-Din Zangi, which began in 1154, a second monumental clock, the Jayrun Water Clock, was built on his personal orders. It was constructed outside the eastern entrance to the mosque, called Bab Jayrun, by the architect Muhammad al-Sa'ati, was rebuilt by al-Sa'ati following a fire in 1167, and was eventually repaired by his son, Ridwan, in the early 13th century. It may have survived into the 14th century. The Arab geographer al-Idrisi visited the mosque in 1154.

Damascus witnessed the establishment of several religious institutions under the Ayyubids, but the Umayyad Mosque retained its place as the center of religious life in the city. Muslim traveler Ibn Jubayr described the mosque as containing many different zawaya (religious lodges) for religious and Quranic studies. In 1173, the northern wall of the mosque was damaged again by the fire and was rebuilt by the Ayyubid sultan, Saladin (r. 1174–1193), along with the Minaret of the Bride, which had been destroyed in the 1069 fire. During the internal feuds between later Ayyubid princes, the city was dealt a great deal of damage, and the mosque's eastern minaret—known as the 'Minaret of Jesus'—was destroyed at the hands of as-Salih Ayyub of Egypt while besieging as-Salih Ismail of Damascus in 1245. The minaret was later rebuilt with little decoration. Saladin, along with many of his successors, were buried around the Umayyad Mosque (see Mausoleum of Saladin).

=== Mamluk era ===
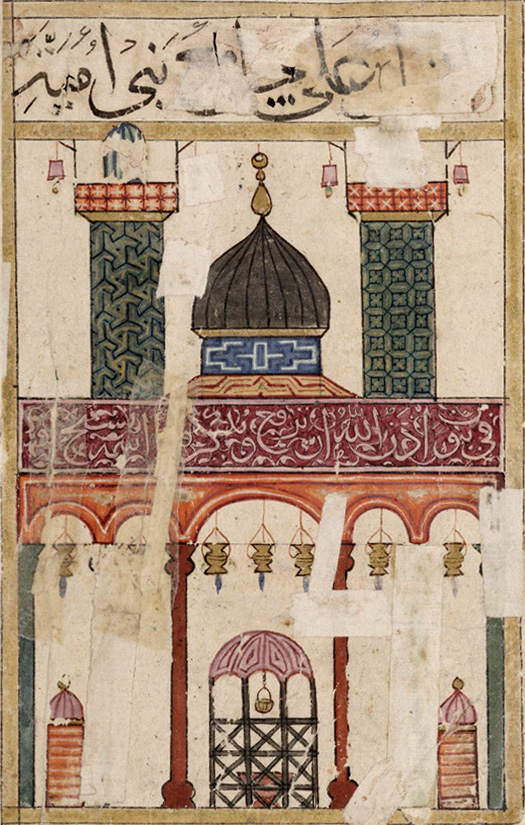
Umayyad Mosque as depicted in the Book of Wonders, a late 14th-century Arabic manuscript

The Mongols, under the leadership of the Nestorian Christian Kitbuqa, with the help of some submitted Western Christian forces, captured Damascus from the Ayyubids in 1260 while Kitbuqa's superior Hulagu Khan had returned to the Mongol Empire for other business. Bohemond VI of Antioch, one of the Western Christian generals in the invasion, ordered Catholic Mass to be performed in the Umayyad Mosque. However, the Muslim Mamluks of Egypt, led by Sultan Qutuz and Baybars, wrested control of the city from the Mongols later in the same year, killing Kitbuqa in the Battle of Ain Jalut, and the purpose of the Mosque was returned from Christian to its original Islamic function. In 1270, Baybars, by now sultan, ordered extensive restorations to the mosque, particularly its marble, mosaics and gildings. According to Baybars' biographer, Ibn Shaddad, the restorations cost the sultan 20,000 dinars. Among the largest mosaic fragments restored was a 34.5 by 7.3 metres (113 by 24 ft) segment in the western portico called the "Barada panel". The mosaics that decorated the mosque were a specific target of the restoration project and they had a major influence on Mamluk architecture in Syria and Egypt.

In 1285, the Hanbali scholar Ibn Taymiyya started teaching Qur'an exegesis in the mosque. When the Ilkhanid Mongols under Ghazan invaded the city in 1300, Ibn Taymiyya preached jihad, urging the citizens of Damascus to resist their occupation. The Mamluks under Sultan Qalawun drove out the Mongols later that year. When Qalawun's forces entered the city, the Mongols attempted to station several catapults in the Umayyad Mosque because the Mamluks had started fires around the citadel to prevent Mongol access to it. The attempt failed as the Mamluks burned the catapults before they were placed in the mosque.

The Mamluk viceroy of Syria, Tankiz, carried out restoration work in the mosque in 1326–1328. He reassembled the mosaics on the qibla wall and replaced all the marble tiles in the prayer hall. Sultan al-Nasir Muhammad also undertook major restoration work for the mosque in 1328. He demolished and completely rebuilt the unstable qibla wall and moved the Bab al-Ziyadah gate to the east. Much of that work was damaged during a fire that burned the mosque in 1339. Islamic art expert, Finbarr Barry Flood, describes the Bahri Mamluks' attitude towards the mosque as an "obsessive interest" and their efforts at maintaining, repairing, and restoring the mosque were unparalleled in any other period of Muslim rule. The Arab astronomer Ibn al-Shatir worked as the chief muwaqqit ('religious timekeeper') and the chief muezzin at the Umayyad Mosque from 1332 until he died in 1376. He erected a large sundial on the mosque's northern minaret in 1371, now lost. A replica was installed in its place in the modern period. The Minaret of Jesus was burnt down in a fire in 1392.

The Mongol conqueror Timur besieged Damascus in 1400. He ordered the burning of the city on 17 March 1401, and the fire ravaged the Umayyad Mosque. The eastern minaret was reduced to rubble, and the central dome collapsed. Another fire damaged the mosque in October 1479, causing the Mamluk sultan Qaitbay (r. 1468–1496) to sponsor repair works. This included the reconstruction of the southwestern minaret in 1488.

=== Ottoman era ===
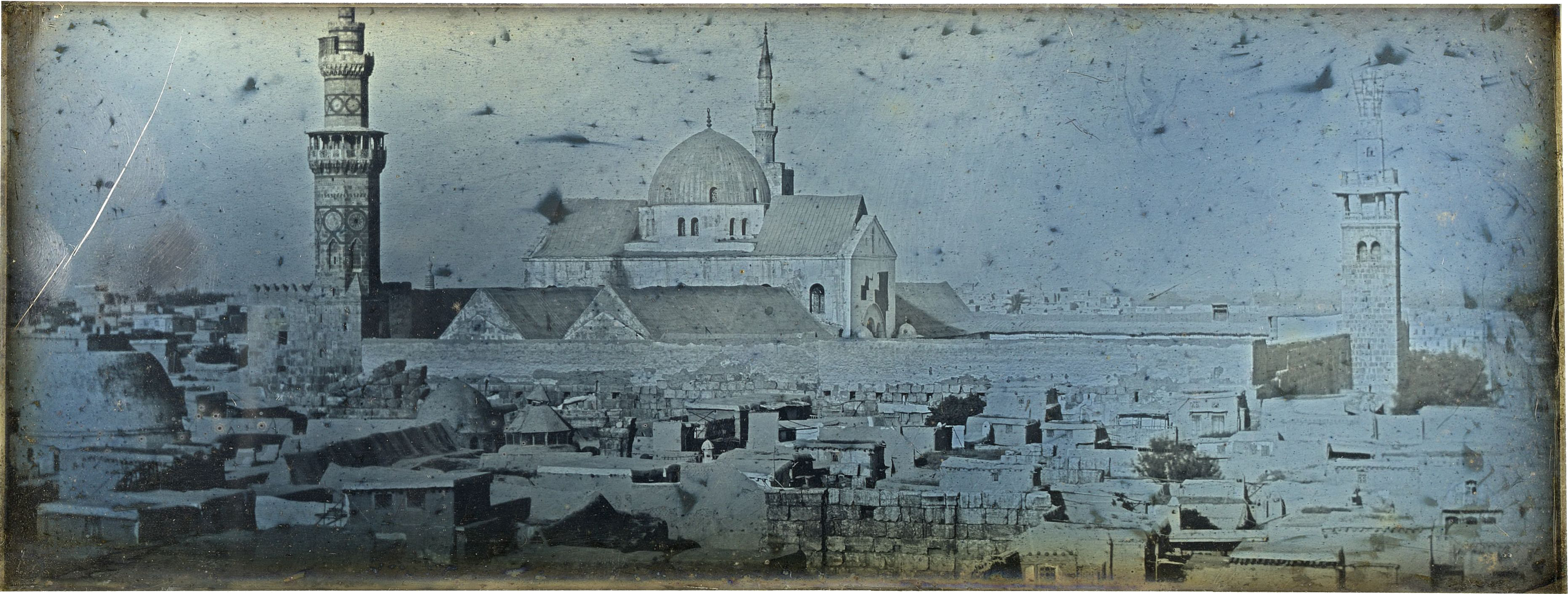
1842 daguerreotype by Joseph-Philibert Girault de Prangey (the earliest photography of the site)

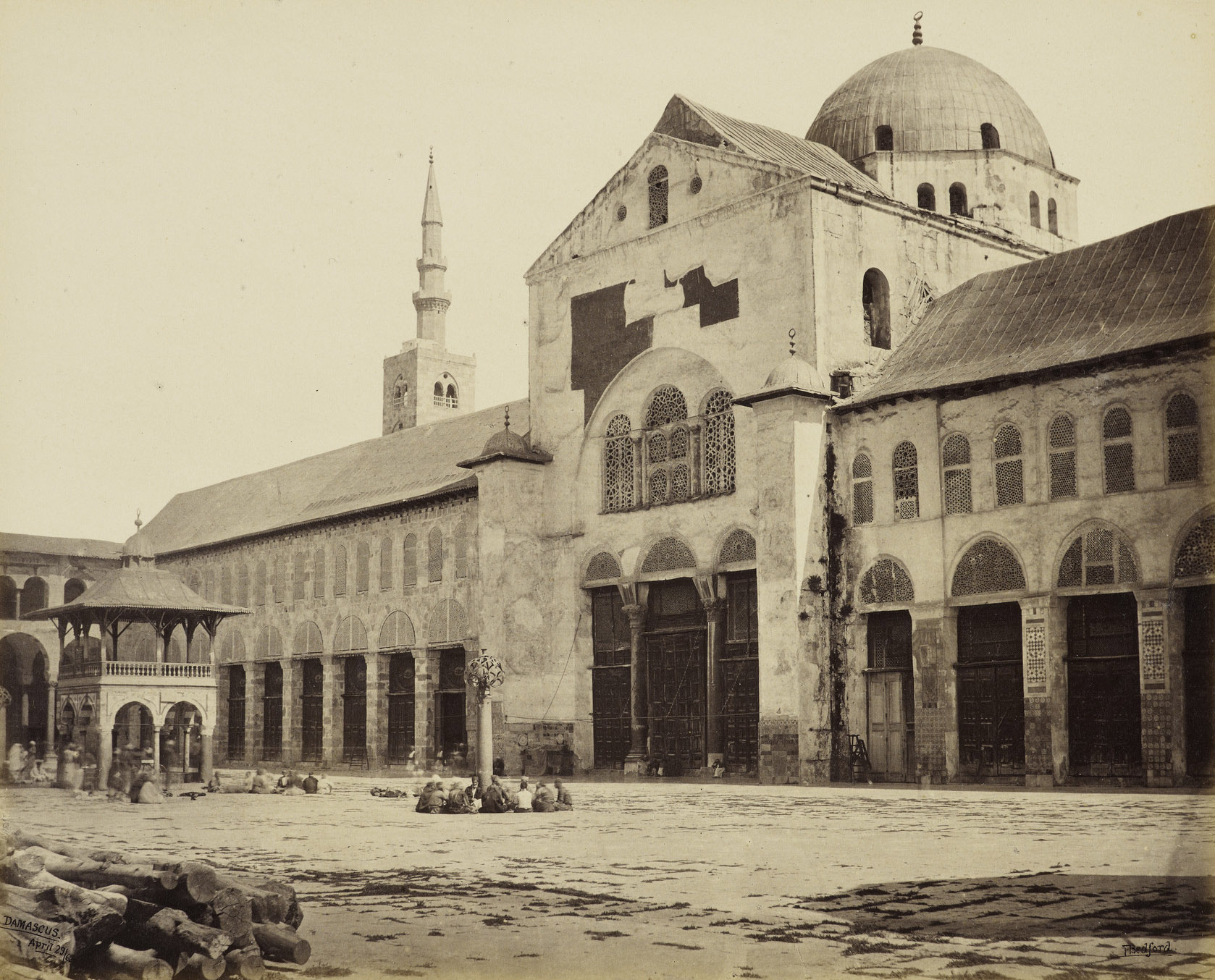
1862 photograph of the main prayer hall facade, from the courtyard looking south-east, with the Minaret of Isa in the background

Damascus was conquered from the Mamluks by the Ottoman Empire under Sultan Selim I in 1516. The first Friday prayer performed in Selim's name in the Umayyad Mosque was attended by the sultan himself. The Ottomans used an endowment system (waqf) for religious sites as a means to link the local population with the central authority. The waqf of the Umayyad Mosque was the largest in the city, employing 596 people. Supervisory and clerical positions were reserved for Ottoman officials while religious offices were held mostly by members of the local ulema (Muslim scholars). Although the awqaf (plural of "waqf") were taxed, the waqf of the Umayyad Mosque was exempted from taxation. In 1518, the Ottoman governor of Damascus and supervisor of the mosque's waqf, Janbirdi al-Ghazali, had the mosque repaired and redecorated as part of his architectural reconstruction program for the city.

The prominent Sufi scholar Abd al-Ghani al-Nabulsi taught regularly at the Umayyad Mosque starting in 1661.

In 1743 or 1744 restoration works were carried out under the orders of the treasurer of Damascus, Fathi al-Daftari. The governor of Damascus, As'ad Pasha al-Azm, had the mosque redecorated in 1750 and 1755. The mosque was severely damaged in the late 1759 earthquakes. In early 1760, Sultan Mustafa III dispatched a team led by Mustafa Sabanikhzade and a leading architect to oversee the more than year-long repairs, the funds for which were provided by the sultan and from the estates of many Damascenes who had perished in the plague that year. The governor Uthman Pasha al-Kurji built a pool in the courtyard of the Umayyad Mosque whose water was supplied by the Qanawat aqueduct in 1769 or 1770.

The khatib (preacher) of the Umayyad Mosque was one of the three most influential religious officials in Ottoman Damascus, the other two being the Hanafi mufti and the naqib al-ashraf. He served as a link between the imperial government in Constantinople and the elites of Damascus and was a key shaper of public opinion in the city. By 1650 members of the mercantile and scholarly Mahasini family held the position, retaining it for much of the 18th and early and mid-19th centuries, partly due to their links with the Shaykh al-Islam in the imperial capital. In the late 19th century, another Damascene family with connections in Constantinople, the Khatibs, vied for the position. After the death of the Mahasini preacher in 1869, a member of the Khatibs succeeded him.

The mosque's prayer hall was once again ravaged and partly destroyed by fire in 1893. A laborer engaging in repair work accidentally started the fire when he was smoking his nargila (water pipe). The fire destroyed the inner fabric of the prayer hall and caused the collapse of the mosque's central dome. The Ottomans fully restored the mosque, largely maintaining the original layout. The restoration process, which lasted nine years, did not attempt to reproduce the original decoration. The central mihrab was replaced and the dome was rebuilt in a contemporary Ottoman style. The rubble and damaged elements from the fire, including some of the original pillars and mosaic remains, were simply disposed of.

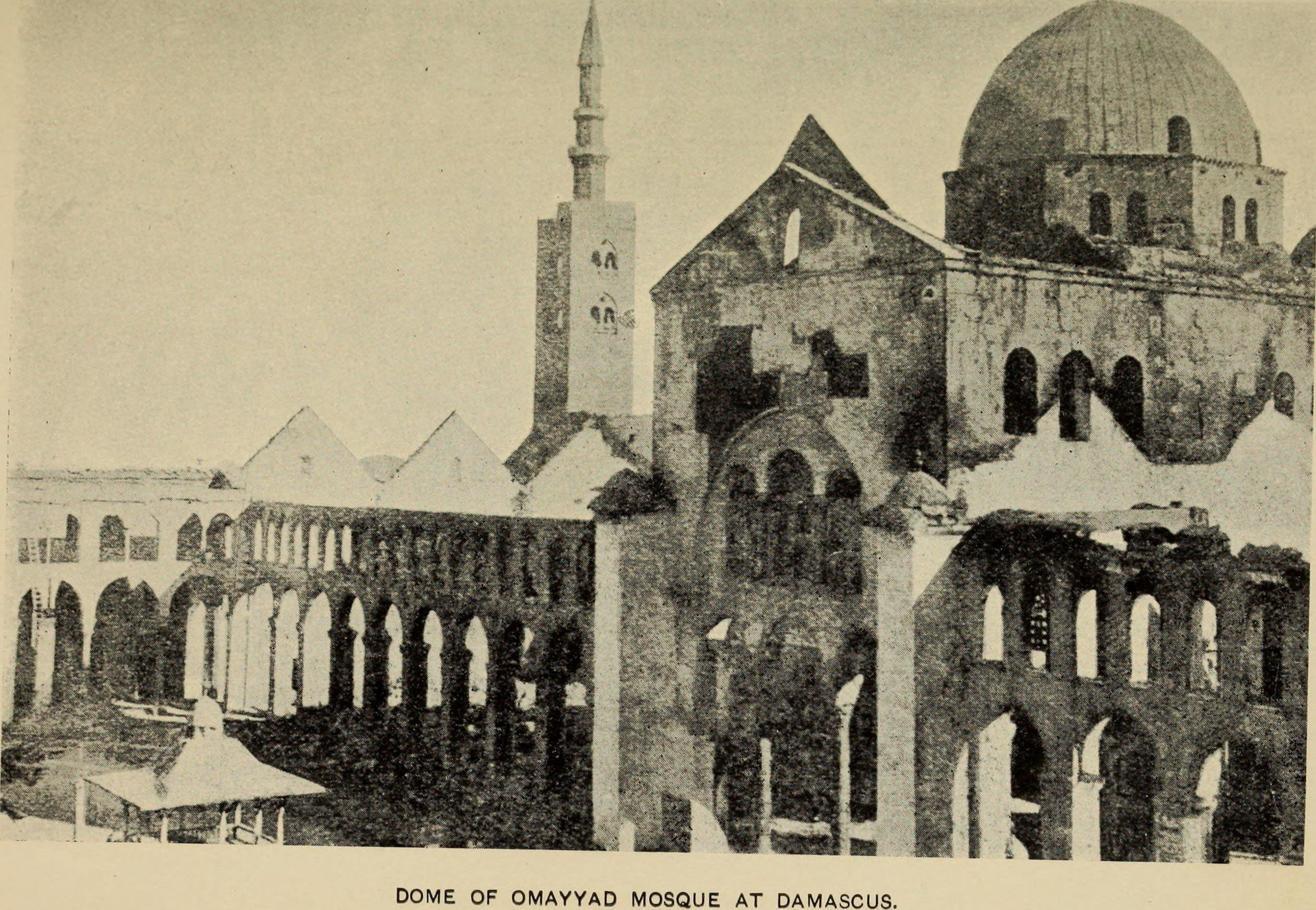
The mosque after the 1893 fire (photo from 1898)

Until 1899 the mosque's library included the "very old" Qubbat al-Khazna collection; "most of its holdings were given to the German emperor Wilhelm II and only a few pieces kept for the National Archives in Damascus."

In 1902, Ottoman photographer Ali Sami Bey documented the manuscript fragments held in the mosque's Qubbat al-Khazna for the Ottoman government, producing more than 3,116 photographs before the fragments were handed over to German officials. These photographs are now lost.

It is the burial place of the first three officers of the Ottoman Aviation Squadrons who died on mission, in this case the Istanbul-Cairo expedition in 1914. They were Navy Lieutenant Fethi Bey and his navigator, Artillery First Lieutenant Sadık Bey and Artillery Second Lieutenant Nuri Bey.

=== Modern era ===
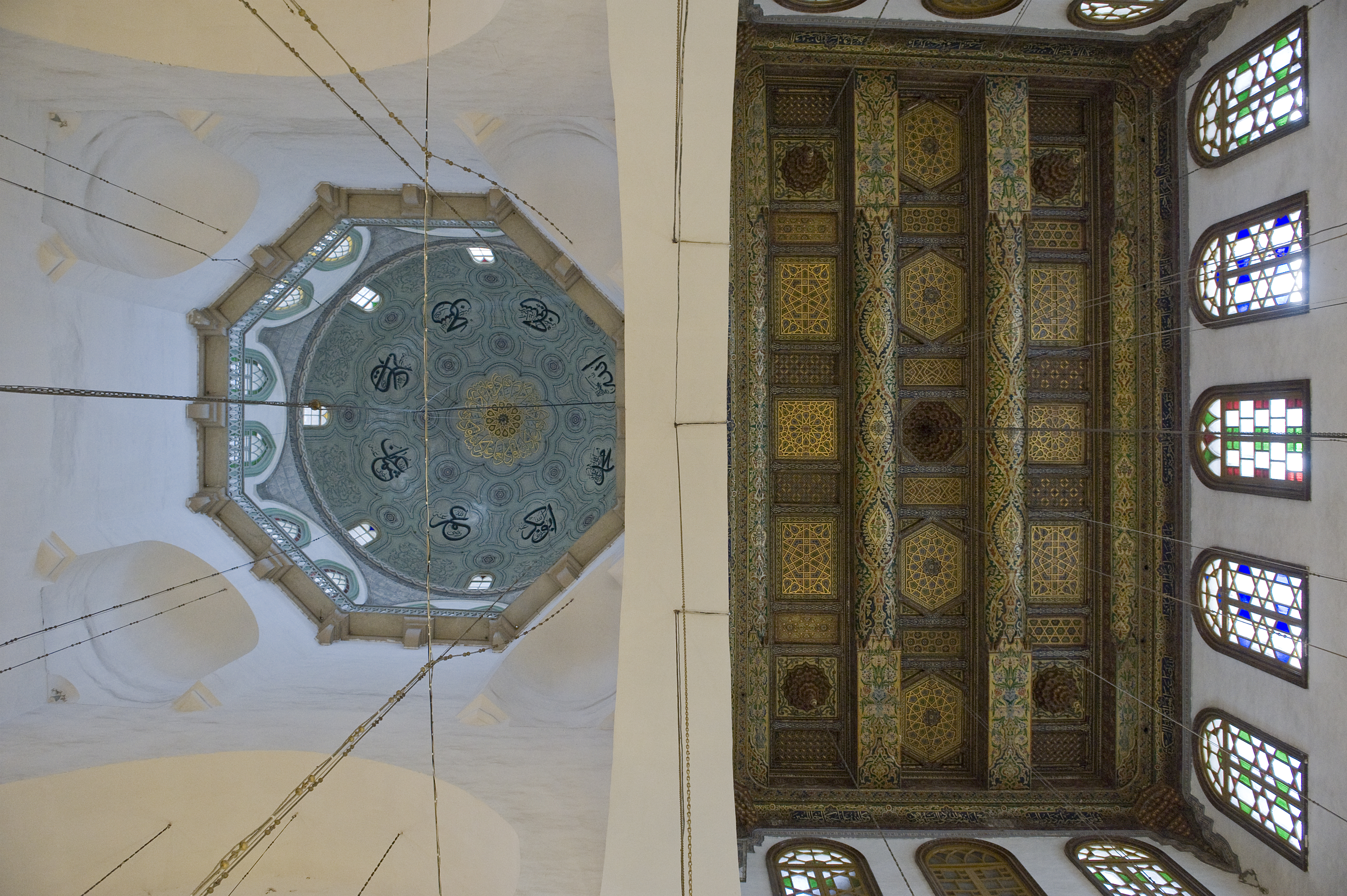
The ceiling above the main mihrab and the interior of Qubbat Al-Nasr (Dome of the Eagle)

The Umayyad Mosque underwent major restorations in 1929 during the French Mandate over Syria and in 1954 and 1963 under the Syrian Republic.

In the 1980s and in the early 1990s, Syrian president Hafez al-Assad ordered a wide-scale renovation of the mosque. The methods and concepts of Assad's restoration project were heavily criticized by UNESCO, but the general approach in Syria was that the mosque was more of a symbolic monument rather than a historical one and thus, its renovation could only enhance the mosque's symbolism.

In 1990s, Mohammed Burhanuddin constructed a zarih of the martyrs of the Battle of Karbala, whose heads were brought to the Mosque after their defeat at the hands of the then Umayyad caliph, Yazid I.

In 2001, Pope John Paul II visited the mosque, primarily to visit the relics of John the Baptist. It was the first time a pope paid a visit to a mosque.

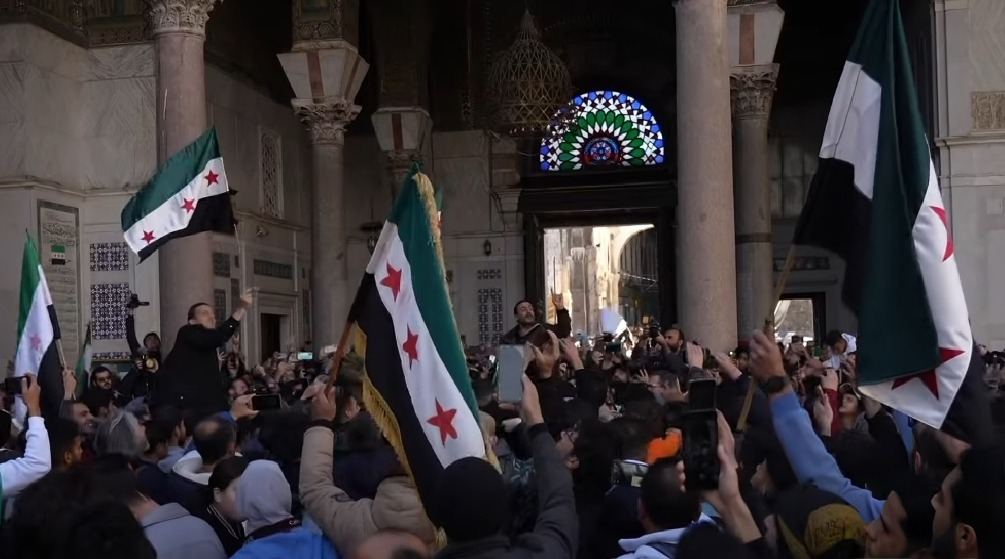
Worshippers congregate at the Umayyad Mosque on 14 December 2024, celebrating the first Friday prayers after the fall of the Assad government

On March 15, 2011, the first significant protests related to the Arab Spring and eventually the Syrian civil war began at the Umayyad Mosque when 40–50 worshippers gathered outside the complex and chanted pro-democracy slogans. Syrian security forces swiftly quelled the protests and cordoned off the area during Friday prayers to prevent large-scale demonstrations. After the fall of the Assad regime and the victory of opposition forces in the civil war, Hay'at Tahrir al-Sham leader Ahmed al-Sharaa gave a victory speech from Umayyad Mosque during which he declared a new era in Syria's history.

== Architecture ==
The ground plan of the Umayyad Mosque is rectangular in shape and measures 97 meters (318 ft) by 156 meters (512 ft). A large courtyard occupies the northern part of the mosque complex, while the prayer hall or haram ('sanctuary') covers the southern part. The mosque is enclosed by four exterior walls which were part of the temenos of the original Roman temple.

=== Sanctuary ===
Three arcades make up the interior space of the sanctuary. They are parallel to the direction of prayer which is towards Mecca. The arcades are supported by two rows of stone Corinthian columns. Each of the arcades contain two levels. The first level consists of large semi-circular arches, while the second level is made up of double arches. This pattern is the same repeated by the arcades of the courtyard. The three interior arcades intersect in the center of the sanctuary with a larger, higher arcade that is perpendicular to the qibla wall and faces the mihrab and the minbar. The central transept divides the arcades into two halves each with eleven arches. The entire sanctuary measures 136 meters (446 ft) by 37 meters (121 ft) and takes up the southern half of the mosque complex.

Four mihrabs line the sanctuary's rear wall, the main one being the Great Mihrab which is located roughly at the center of the wall. The Mihrab of the Sahaba, named after the sahaba ('companions of Muhammad') is situated in the eastern half. According to the 9th-century Muslim engineer Musa ibn Shakir, the latter mihrab was built during the mosque's initial construction and it became the third niche-formed mihrab in Islam's history.

The central dome of the mosque is known as the 'Dome of the Eagle' (Qubbat an-Nisr) and located atop the center of the prayer hall. The original wooden dome was replaced by one built of stone following the 1893 fire. It receives its name because it is thought to resemble an eagle, with the dome itself being the eagle's head while the eastern and western flanks of the prayer hall represent the wings. With a height of 36 meters (118 ft), the dome rests on an octagonal substructure with two arched windows on each of its sides. It is supported by the central interior arcade and has openings along its parameter.

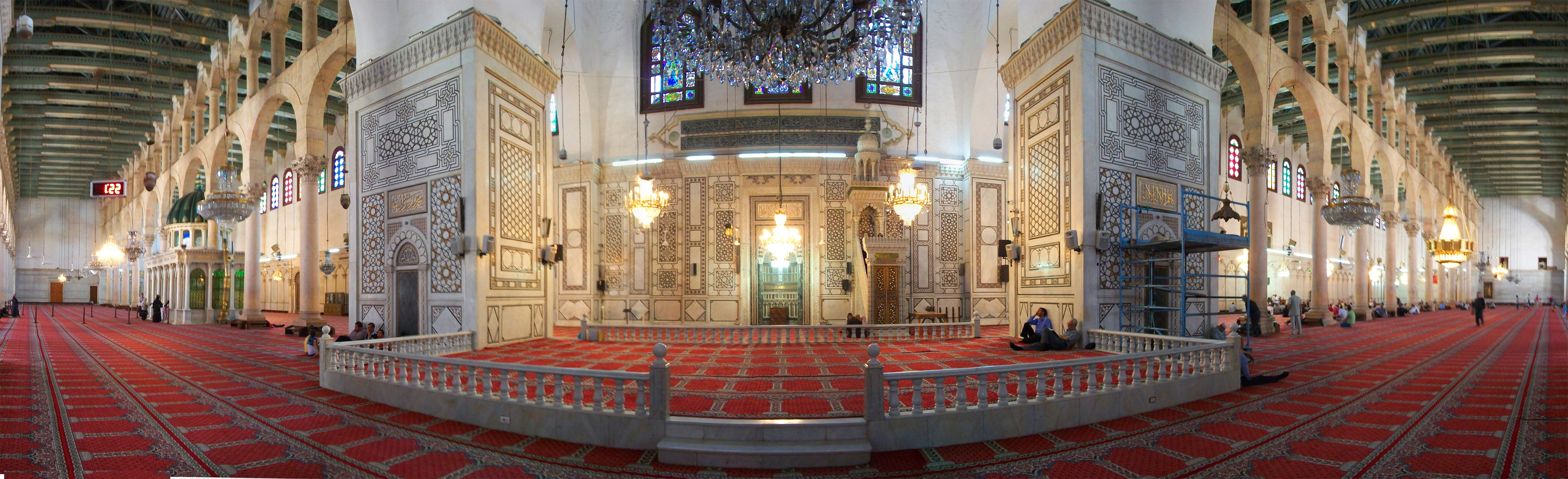
Panoramic view of the prayer hall, with the mihrab in the center (looking south) and the Shrine of John the Baptist visible to the left

=== Courtyard ===
In the courtyard (sahn), the level of the stone pavement had become uneven over time due to several repairs throughout the mosque's history. Recent work on the courtyard has restored it to its consistent Umayyad-era levels. Arcades (riwaq) surround the courtyard supported by alternating stone columns and piers. There is one pier in between every two columns. Because the northern part of the courtyard had been destroyed in an earthquake in 1759, the arcade is not consistent; when the northern wall was rebuilt the columns that were supporting it were not. The courtyard and its arcades contain the largest preserved remnants of the mosque's Umayyad-era mosaic decoration.

Several domed pavilions stand in the courtyard. The Dome of the Treasury is an octagonal structure decorated with mosaics, standing on eight Roman columns in the western part of the courtyard. Its 8th-century mosaics were largely remade in the late 20th-century restoration. In a mirror position on the other side of the courtyard is the Dome of the Clock, another octagonal domed pavilion. Near the middle of the courtyard, sheltering an ablutions fountain at ground level, is a rectangular pavilion which is a modern reconstruction of a late Ottoman pavilion.

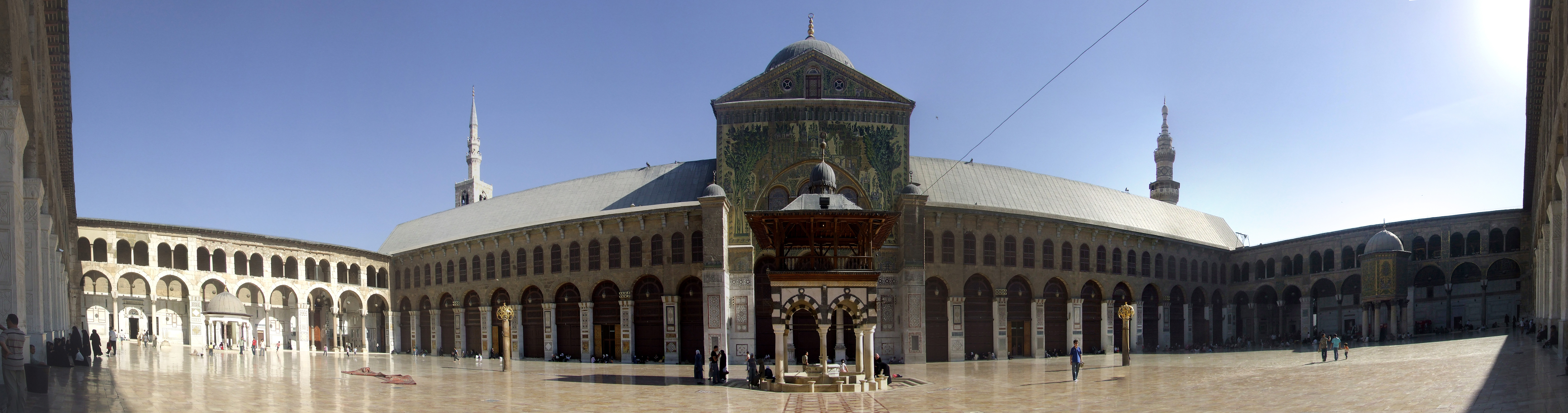
Courtyard of the Umayyad Mosque, view from east (left) towards west (right). Notable structures: Dome of the Clock (far left), and the Minaret of Isa (Jesus).

=== Minarets ===
Within the Umayyad Mosque complex are three minarets. The Minaret of Isa on the southeast corner, the Minaret of Qaitbay (also called Madhanat al-Gharbiyya) on the southwest corner, and the Minaret of the Bride located along the northern wall.

==== Minaret of the Bride ====
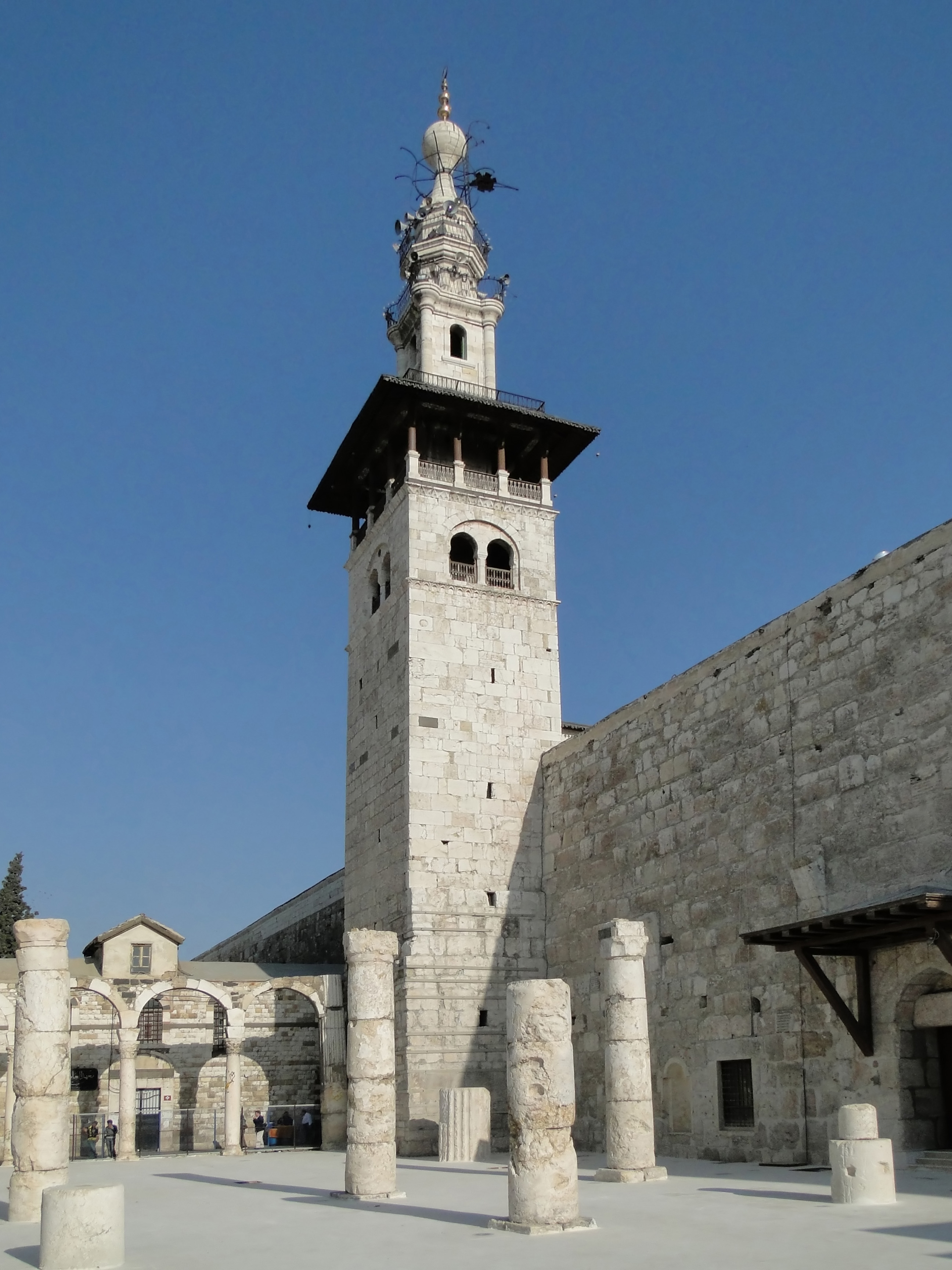
Minaret of the Bride, the first minaret built for the mosque

The Minaret of the Bride was the first one built and is located on the mosque's northern wall. The exact year of the minaret's original construction is unknown. The bottom part of the minaret most likely dates back to the Abbasid era in the 9th century. While it is possible that the Umayyads built it, there is no indication that a minaret on the northern wall was a part of al-Walid I's initial concept. Al-Muqaddasi visited the minaret in 985 when Damascus was under Abbasid control and described it as "recently built". The upper segment was constructed in 1174. This minaret is used by the muezzin for the call to prayer (adhan) and there is a spiral staircase of 160 stone steps that lead to the muezzin's calling position. The Minaret of the Bride is divided into two sections; the main tower and the spire which are separated by a lead roof. The oldest part of the minaret, or the main tower, is square in shape, has four galleries, and consists of two different forms of masonry; the base consists of large blocks, while the upper section is built of dressed stone. There are two light openings near the top of the main tower, before the roof, with horseshoe arches and cubical capitals enclosed in a single arch. A smaller arched corbel is located below these openings. According to local legend, the minaret is named after the daughter of the merchant who provided the lead for the minaret's roof who was married to Syria's ruler at the time. Attached to the Minaret of the Bride is the 18th-century replica of the 14th-century sundial built by Ibn al-Shatir.

==== Minaret of Isa ====
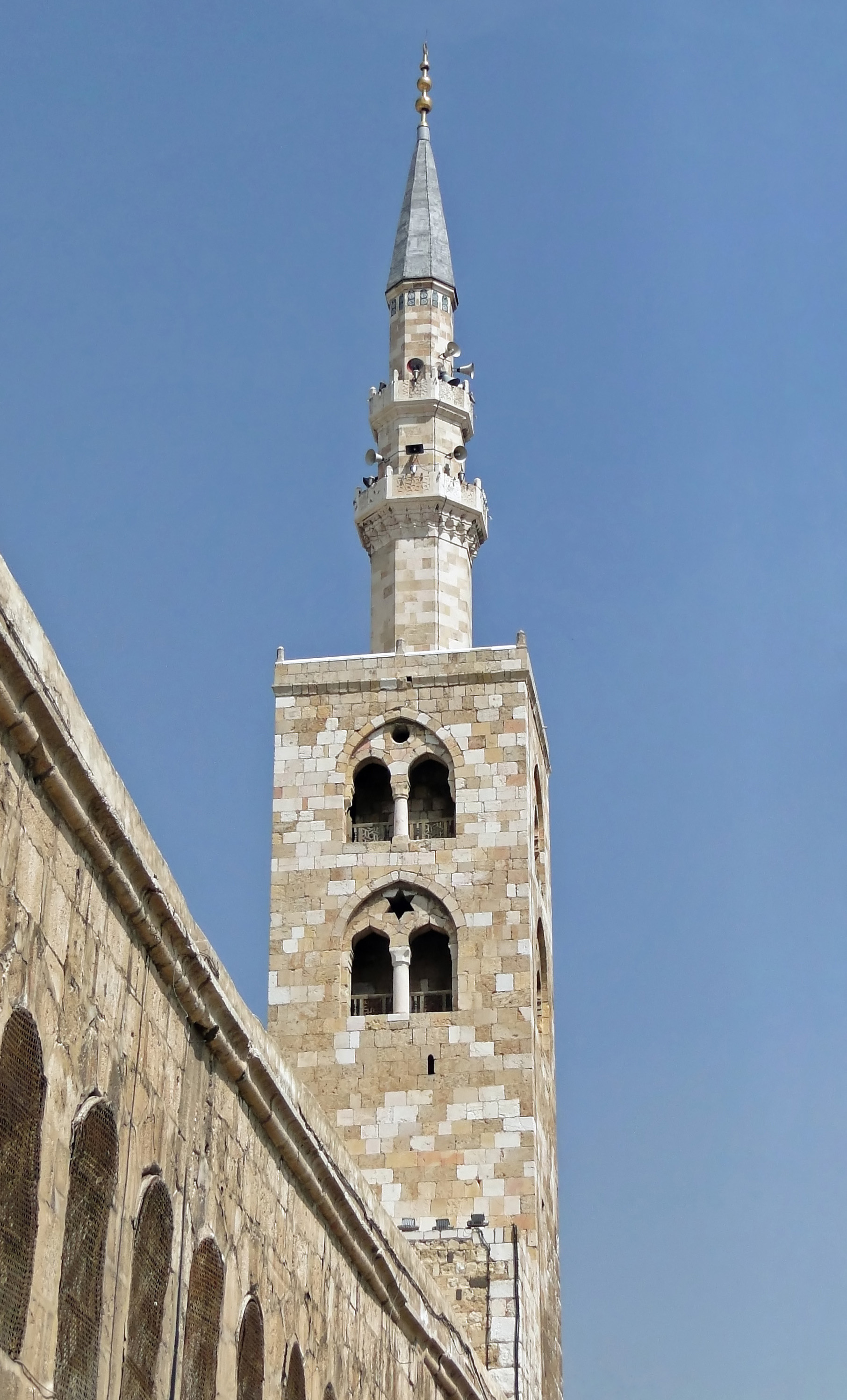
Minaret of Isa, the mosque's tallest minaret

The Minaret of Isa is around 77 meters (253 ft) in height and the tallest of the three minarets. Some sources claim it was originally built by the Abbasids in the 9th century. The main body of the current minaret was built by the Ayyubids in 1247, but the upper section was constructed by the Ottomans. The main body of the minaret is square-shaped and the spire is octagonal. It tapers to a point and is surmounted by a crescent (as are the other two minarets). Two covered galleries are situated in the main body and two open galleries are located on the spire. Islamic belief holds that Isa (Jesus) will descend from heaven during the time of the Fajr prayer and will pray behind the Mahdi. He will then confront the Antichrist. According to local Damascene tradition, relating from hadith, Isa will reach earth via the Minaret of Isa, hence its name. Ibn Kathir, a prominent 14th-century Muslim scholar, backed this notion.

==== Minaret of Qaitbay ====
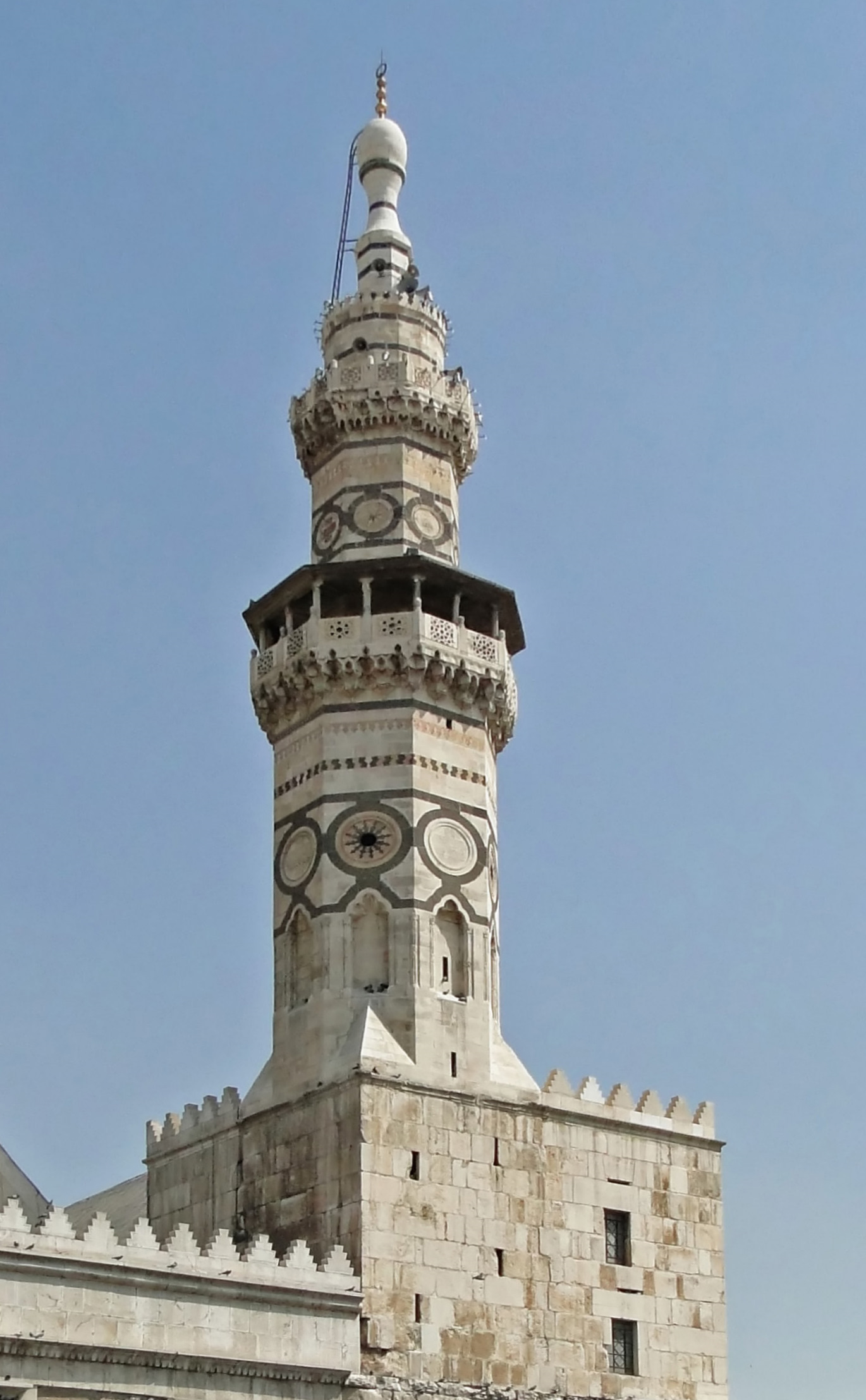
Minaret of Qaitbay built in 1488

The Minaret of Qaitbay was built by Qaitbay in 1488. He also commissioned its renovation due to the 1479 fire. The minaret displays strong Islamic-era Egyptian architectural influence typical of the Mamluk period. It is octagonal in shape and built in receding sections with three galleries. It is generally believed that both the Minaret of Jesus and the Western Minaret were built on the foundation of ancient Roman towers. In October 2025, nearly one year after the fall of the Assad regime, the name of Hafez al-Assad, which had been inscribed on the Qaitbay Minaret following earlier restoration works, was removed.

=== Influence on mosque architecture ===
The Umayyad Mosque is one of the few early mosques in the world to have maintained the same general structure and architectural features since its initial construction in the early 8th century. Its Umayyad character has not been significantly altered. Since its establishment, the mosque has served as a model for congregational mosque architecture in Syria as well as globally. According to Flood, "the construction of the Damascus mosque not only irrevocably altered the urban landscape of the city, inscribing upon it a permanent affirmation of Muslim hegemony, but by giving the Syrian congregational mosque its definitive form it also transformed the subsequent history of the mosque in general." The influence of the Umayyad Mosque's ground plan can be found in many mosques in the historic Muslim world, such as the al-Azhar Mosque and Baybars Mosque in Cairo, the Great Mosque of Cordoba in Spain, and the Bursa Grand Mosque and Edirne's Grand Mosque in Turkey. Mosques that have been directly influenced by the mosque's façade design are the Great Mosque of Diyarbakir in Turkey, and the Ayyubid era Al-Tawba Mosque in Damascus.

== Religious significance ==
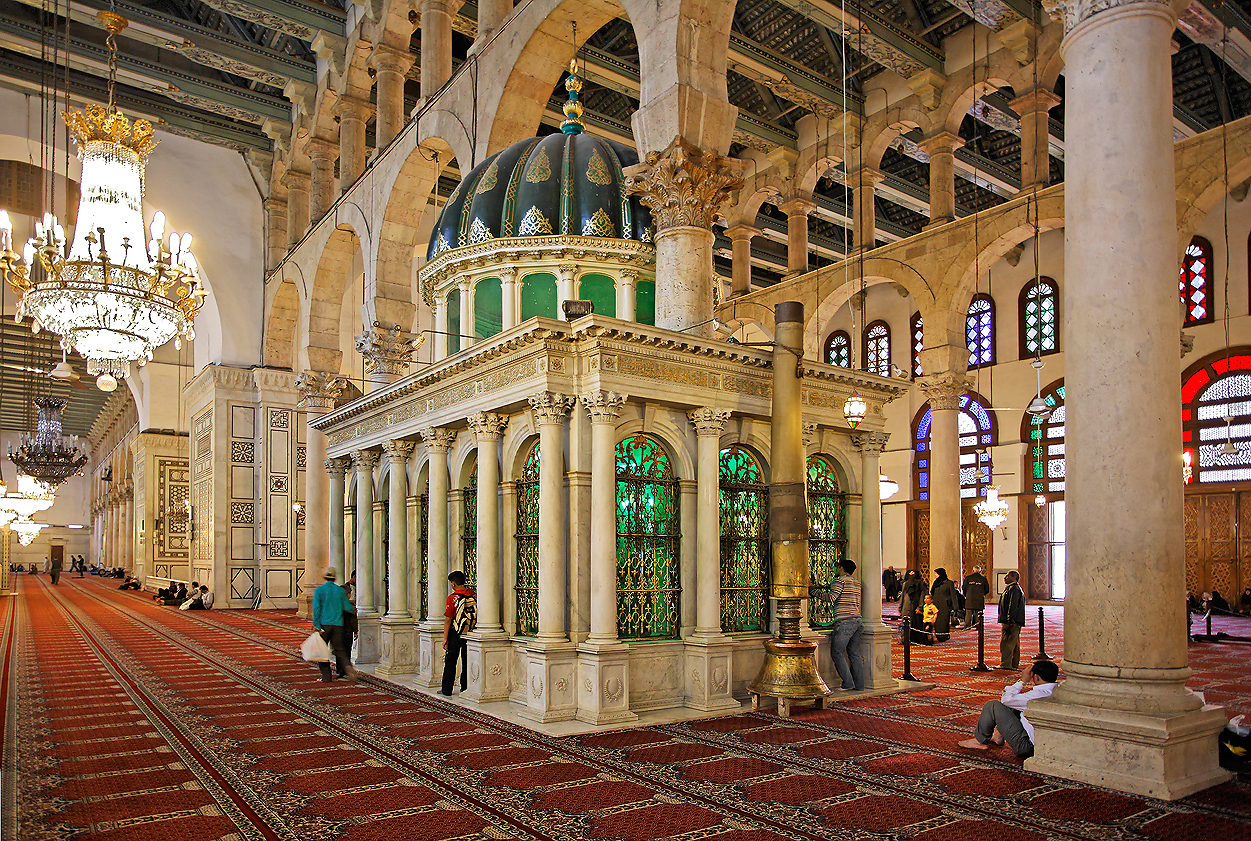
Shrine purportedly housing the head of the Prophet Yahya (John the Baptist)

According to some, the mosque is the fourth holiest site of Islam. A Christian tradition dating to the 6th century developed an association between the former cathedral structure and John the Baptist. Legend had it that his head was buried there. Ibn al-Faqih relays that during the construction of the mosque, workers found a cave-chapel which had a box containing the head of John the Baptist, known as Yahya ibn Zakariya by Muslims. Upon learning of that and examining it, al-Walid I ordered the head buried under a specific pillar in the mosque that was later inlaid with marble.

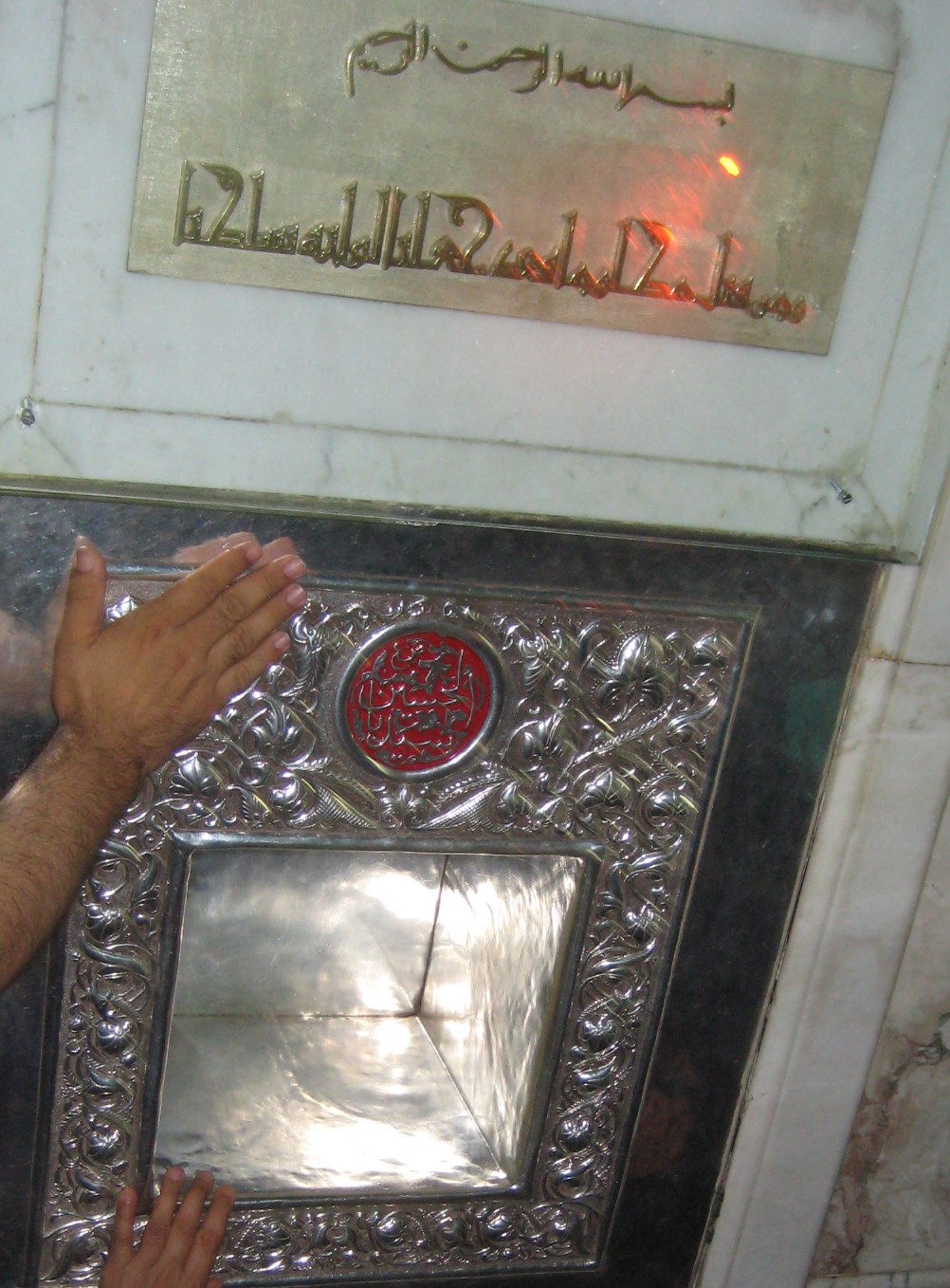
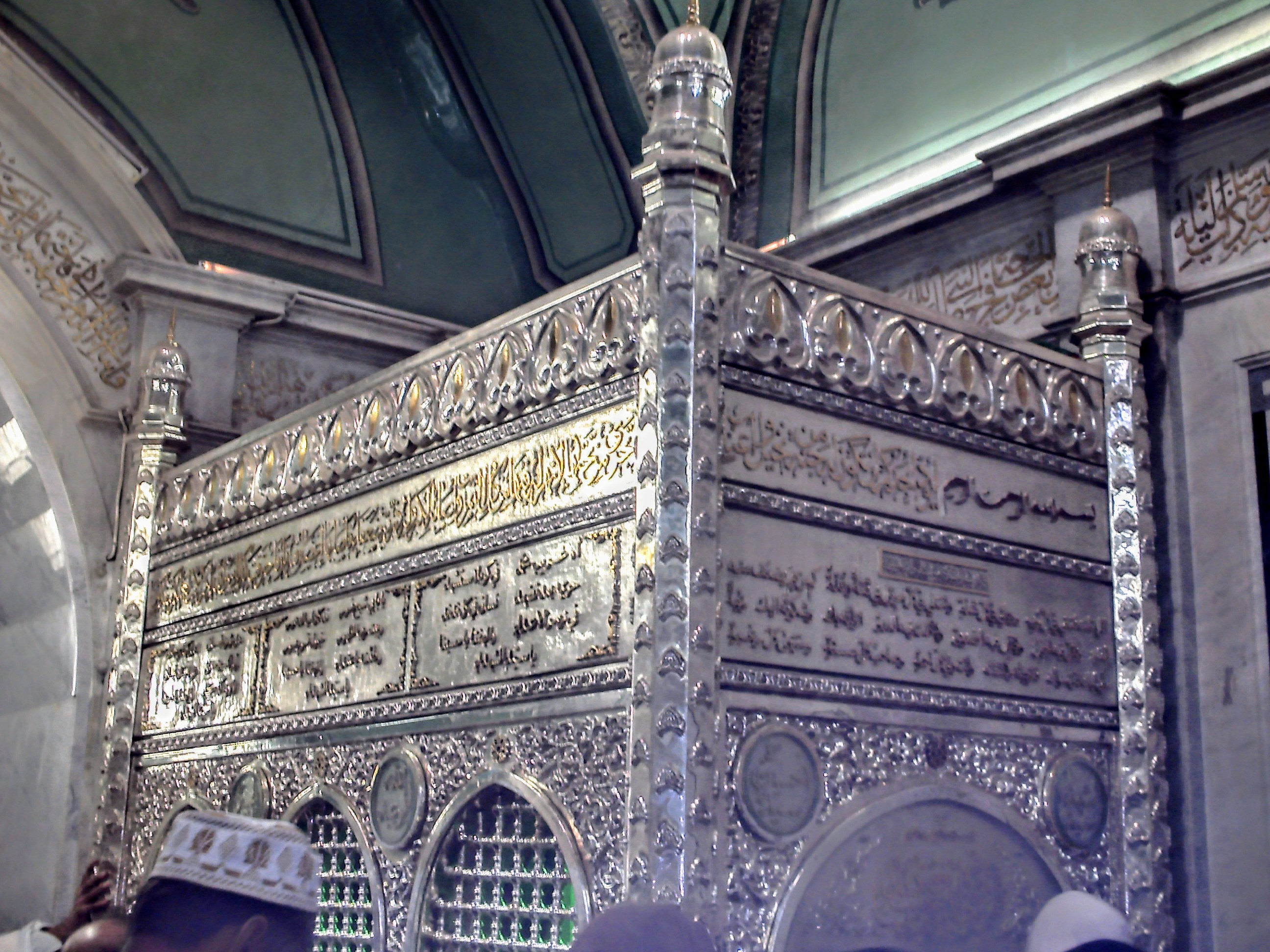
Left: The location where Al-Husayn's head was kept for display. Right: Purported tomb of Al-Husayn's head.

According to one hadith reported by Muslim ibn al-Hajjaj, the Great Mosque of Damascus is the site where Jesus will descend from heaven at his Second Coming, appearing on a "white minaret". Most Muslim theologians interpret this passage as symbolic rather than literal. In a study of Muslim sources, William Richard Oakes suggests that some aspects of this hadith could date from the late Umayyad period, when the mosque was built, rather than from Muhammad's time, when Damascus had not yet been conquered by Muslims.

Two shrines commemorating the Islamic prophet Muhammad's grandson Husayn ibn Ali, whose martyrdom is also compared in Shi'a tradition to that of John the Baptist, exist within the building premises.

== See also ==
- Ablaq
- Great Mosque of Aleppo
- List of the oldest mosques in the world
- Religious significance of the Syrian region
- Timeline of Islamic history
- Early medieval domes
- Umayyad Mosque of Baalbek

== Bibliography ==
- Abdulkarim, Maamoun (2003). "Syria in the times of Apollodorus of Damascus". In Calcani, Giuliana (ed.). Apollodorus of Damascus and Trajan's Column: from tradition to project. L'Erma di Bretschneider. ISBN 88-8265-233-5.
- Ali, Wijdan (1999). The Arab Contribution to Islamic Art: from the Seventh to the Fifteenth Centuries. American University in Cairo Press. ISBN 978-977-424-476-6.
- "American Architect and Architecture". American Architect and Architecture. XLIII (945). J. R. Osgood & Co: 57–58. 1894.
- Berney, K. A.; Ring, Trudy (1996). International Dictionary of Historic Places, Volume 4: Middle East and Africa. Fitzroy Dearborn Publishers. ISBN 1-884964-03-6.
- Blankinship, Khalid Yahya (1994). The End of the Jihâd State: The Reign of Hishām ibn ʻAbd al-Malik and the Collapse of the Umayyads. Albany, New York: State University of New York Press. ISBN 978-0-7914-1827-7.
- Bowersock, Glen Warren; Brown, Peter Lamont (2001). Interpreting Late Antiquity: Essays on the Postclassical World. Harvard University Press. ISBN 0-674-00598-8.
- Brinner, William M., ed. (1963). A Chronicle of Damascus, 1389–1397. University of California Press.
- Burns, Ross (2009) [1992]. The Monuments of Syria: A Guide. I.B. Tauris. ISBN 9781845119478.
- Burns, Ross (2007) [2005]. Damascus: a History (2nd ed.). London: Routledge. ISBN 978-0-415-27105-9. OCLC 648281269.
- Burns, Ross (2005), Damascus: A History, London: Routledge, ISBN 0-415-27105-3.
- Charette, François (2003). Mathematical Instrumentation in Fourteenth-Century Egypt and Syria: The Illustrated Treatise of Najm al-Dīn al-Mīṣrī. Brill. ISBN 978-90-04-13015-9.
- Cooke, Miriam (2007). Dissident Syria: Making Oppositional Arts Official. Durham, North Carolina: Duke University Press. ISBN 978-0-8223-4016-4.
- Darke, Diana (2010). Syria (2nd ed.). Chalfont St Peter: Bradt Travel Guides. ISBN 978-1-84162-314-6. OCLC 501398372.
- Degeorge, Gérard (2004). Damascus. Flammarion. ISBN 2080304569.
- Dumper, Michael; Stanley, Bruce E. (2007). Cities of the Middle East and North Africa: A Historical Encyclopedia. ABC-CLIO. ISBN 978-1-57607-919-5.
- Elisséeff, Nikita (1965). "Dimashk". In Lewis, B.; Pellat, Ch. & Schacht, J. (eds.). The Encyclopaedia of Islam, Second Edition. Volume II: C–G. Leiden: E. J. Brill. pp. 277–291. OCLC 495469475.
- Enderlein, Volkmar (2011). "Syria and Palestine: The Umayyad Caliphate". In Hattstein, Markus; Delius, Peter (eds.). Islam: Art and Architecture. H. F. Ullmann. pp. 58–87. ISBN 9783848003808.
- Ettinghausen, Richard; Grabar, Oleg; Jenkins-Madina, Marilyn (2001). Islamic Art and Architecture: 650–1250 (2nd ed.). Yale University Press. ISBN 9780300088670.
- Fehérvári, G. (1993). "Miḥrāb". In Bosworth, C. E.; van Donzel, E.; Heinrichs, W. P. & Pellat, Ch. (eds.). The Encyclopaedia of Islam, Second Edition. Volume VII: Mif–Naz. Leiden: E. J. Brill. pp. 7–15. ISBN 978-90-04-09419-2.
- Finkel, Caroline (2005). Osman's Dream: The Story of the Ottoman Empire, 1300–1923. Basic Books. ISBN 0-465-02396-7.
- Fischel, Walter Joseph (1952). Ibn Khaldūn and Tamerlane: Their Historic Meeting in Damascus, 1401 A.D. (803 A.H.) A Study Based on Arabic Manuscripts of Ibn Khaldūn's "Autobiography". University of California Press.
- Flood, Finbarr Barry (1997). "Umayyad Survivals and Mamluk Revivals: Qalawunid Architecture and the Great Mosque of Damascus". Muqarnas. 14. Boston: Brill: 57–79. doi:10.2307/1523236. JSTOR 1523236.
- Flood, Finbarr Barry (2001). The Great Mosque of Damascus: Studies on the Makings of an Umayyad Visual Culture. Boston: Brill. ISBN 90-04-11638-9.
- George, Alain (2021). The Umayyad Mosque of Damascus: Art, Faith and Empire in Early Islam. London: Gingko Library. ISBN 9781909942455.
- Grafman, Rafi; Rosen-Ayalon, Myriam (1999). "The Two Great Syrian Umayyad Mosques: Jerusalem and Damascus". Muqarnas. 16. Boston: Brill: 1–15. doi:10.2307/1523262. JSTOR 1523262.
- Hitti, Phillip K. (October 2002). History of Syria: Including Lebanon and Palestine. Piscataway, NJ: Gorgias Press LLC. ISBN 978-1-931956-60-4.
- Kafescioǧlu, Çiǧdem (1999). ""In The Image of Rūm": Ottoman Architectural Patronage in Sixteenth-Century Aleppo and Damascus". Muqarnas. 16. Brill: 70–96. doi:10.2307/1523266. JSTOR 1523266.
- Kamal Ed-Din, Noha, ed. (2002). The Islamic view of Jesus. Translated by Tamir Abu As-Su'ood Muhammad. Dar al-Manarah. ISBN 977-6005-08-X.
- Khoury, Philip S. (1983). Urban Notables and Arab Nationalism: The Politics of Damascus 1860-1920. Cambridge University Press. ISBN 0-521-24796-9.
- Kleiner, Fred (2013). Gardner's Art through the Ages, Vol. I. Cengage Learning. ISBN 9781111786441.
- Le Strange, Guy (1890), Palestine Under the Moslems: A Description of Syria and the Holy Land from A.D. 650 to 1500, Committee of the Palestine Exploration Fund
- Mannheim, Ivan (2001). Syria & Lebanon Handbook: The Travel Guide. Footprint Travel Guides. ISBN 1-900949-90-3.
- McKenzie, Judith (2007). The architecture of Alexandria and Egypt, c. 300 B.C. to A.D. 700. Yale University Press. ISBN 978-0-300-11555-0. OCLC 873228274.
- Palestine Exploration Fund (1897). Quarterly statement. Published at the Fund's Office. (Ibn Jubayr: p. 240 ff)
- Rafeq, Abdul-Karim (1966). The Province of Damascus, 1723–1783. Beirut: Khayats. OCLC 26512897.
- Rivoira, Giovanni Teresio (1918). Moslem Architecture: Its Origins and Development. Oxford University Press. ISBN 9788130707594.
- Rosenwein, Barbara H. (2014). A Short History of the Middle Ages. University of Toronto Press. ISBN 9781442606142.
- Rudolff, Britta (2006). 'Intangible' and 'Tangible' Heritage: A Topology of Culture in Contexts of Faith (PhD). Johannes Gutenberg-University of Mainz.
- Selin, Helaine, ed. (1997). Encyclopaedia of the History of Science, Technology, and Medicine in Non-Western Cultures. Springer. ISBN 978-0-7923-4066-9.
- Totah, Faedah M. (2009). "Return to the Origin: Negotiating the Modern and Unmodern in the Old City of Damascus". City & Society. 21 (1): 58–81. doi:10.1111/j.1548-744X.2009.01015.x.
- Walker, Bethany J. (March 2004). "Commemorating the Sacred Spaces of the Past: The Mamluks and the Umayyad Mosque at Damascus". Near Eastern Archaeology. 67 (1). The American Schools of Oriental Research: 26–39. doi:10.2307/4149989. JSTOR 4149989. S2CID 164031578.
- Winter, Michael; Levanoni, Amalia (2004). The Mamluks in Egyptian and Syrian Politics and Society. Brill. ISBN 90-04-13286-4.
- Van Leeuwen, Richard (1999). Waqfs and Urban Structures: The Case of Ottoman Damascus. Brill. ISBN 90-04-11299-5.
- Wolff, Richard (2007). The Popular Encyclopedia of World Religions: A User-Friendly Guide to Their Beliefs, History, and Impact on Our World Today. Harvest House Publishers. ISBN 978-0-7369-2007-0.
- Zaimeche, Salah; Ball, Lamaan (2005). Damascus. Manchester: Foundation for Science Technology and Culture.
