= List of cricetines =

Species in mammal subfamily Cricetinae

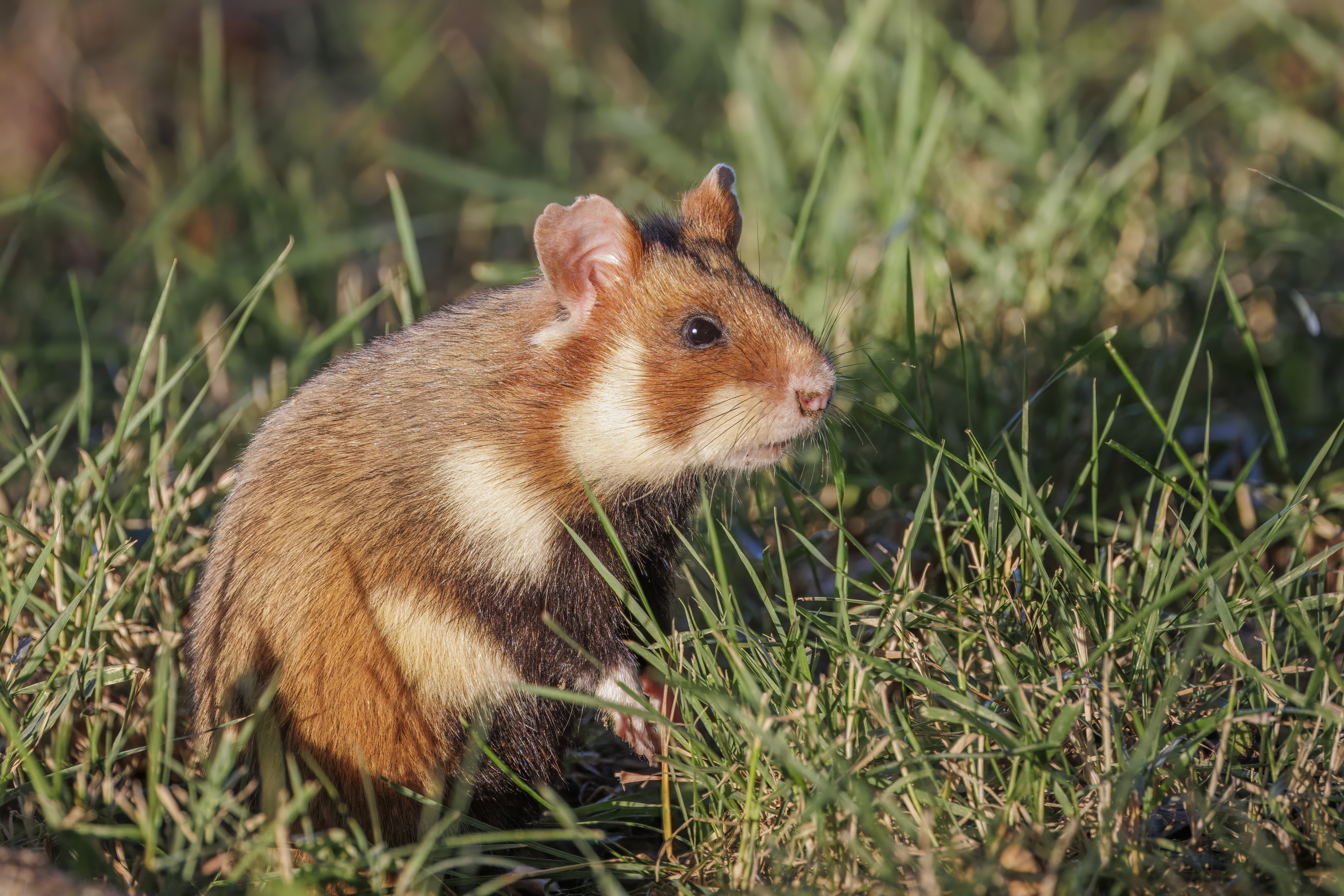
European hamster (Cricetus cricetus)

Cricetinae is a subfamily of mammals in the rodent family Cricetidae, which in turn is part of the Myomorpha suborder in the order Rodentia. Members of this subfamily are called cricetines or hamsters. They are found in Europe and Asia, primarily in shrublands, grasslands, and deserts, though some species can be found in forests and wetlands. They range in size from the Roborovski dwarf hamster, at 7 cm (3 in) plus a 0.5 cm (0.2 in) tail, to the European hamster, at 32 cm (13 in) plus a 7 cm (3 in) tail. Cricetines generally eat shoots and seeds, though some also eat a variety of other vegetation, insects, and small vertebrates. No cricetines have population estimates, but the golden hamster is categorized as endangered, while the European hamster is categorized as critically endangered. Several hamster species, particularly the golden hamster, Chinese striped hamster, and dwarf hamsters, have been domesticated as pets.

The eighteen extant species of Cricetinae are divided into nine genera, ranging in size from one to four species. Several extinct prehistoric cricetine species have been discovered, though due to ongoing research and discoveries, the exact number and categorization is not fixed.

== Conventions ==
IUCN Red List categories
Conservation status
- EX: Extinct (0 species)
- EW: Extinct in the wild (0 species)
- CR: Critically endangered (1 species)
- EN: Endangered (1 species)
- VU: Vulnerable (1 species)
- NT: Near threatened (1 species)
- LC: Least concern (14 species)

The author citation for the species or genus is given after the scientific name; parentheses around the author citation indicate that this was not the original taxonomic placement. Conservation status codes listed follow the International Union for Conservation of Nature (IUCN) Red List of Threatened Species. Range maps are provided wherever possible; if a range map is not available, a description of the cricetine's range is provided. Ranges are based on the IUCN Red List for that species unless otherwise noted.

== Classification ==
Cricetinae is a subfamily of the rodent family Cricetidae consisting of eighteen extant species in nine genera. These genera range in size from one to four species. This does not include hybrid species or extinct prehistoric species.

Subfamily Cricetinae

- Tribe Cricetini
  - Genus Allocricetulus (Mongolian hamsters): two species
  - Genus Cansumys (Gansu hamster): one species
  - Genus Cricetulus (ratlike hamsters): three species
  - Genus Cricetus (European hamster): one species
  - Genus Nothocricetulus: one species
  - Genus Tscherskia (Greater long-tailed hamster): one species
- Tribe Mesocricetini
  - Genus Mesocricetus (golden hamsters): four species
- Tribe Urocricetini
  - Genus Phodopus (dwarf hamsters): three species
  - Genus Urocricetus: two species

- Cricetinae
  - - Urocricetini
      - Phodopus
      - Urocricetus
  - - Mesocricetini
      Mesocricetus
    - Cricetini
      - Cansumys
      - - Tscherskia
        - - Cricetulus
          - - Nothocricetulus
            - - Allocricetulus
              - Cricetus

== Cricetines ==
The following classification is based on the taxonomy described by the reference work Mammal Species of the World (2005), with augmentation by generally accepted proposals made since using molecular phylogenetic analysis, as supported by both the IUCN and the American Society of Mammalogists.

=== Tribe Cricetini ===
Genus Allocricetulus – Argiropulo, 1932 – two species
Common name	Scientific name and subspecies	Range	Size and ecology	IUCN status and estimated population
Eversmann's hamster	A. eversmanni (Brandt, 1859)	Central Asia	Size: 10–14 cm (4–6 in) long, plus 2–4 cm (1–2 in) tail Habitat: Shrubland and grassland Diet: Grains, beans, lentils, roots, and plant material, as well as insects and frogs	LC Unknown
Mongolian hamster	A. curtatus (Allen, 1925)	East-central Asia	Size: 10–13 cm (4–5 in) long, plus 1–3 cm (0.4–1.2 in) tail Habitat: Shrubland Diet: Grains, beans, lentils, roots, and plant material, as well as insects and frogs	LC Unknown

Genus Cansumys – Allen, 1928 – one species
Common name	Scientific name and subspecies	Range	Size and ecology	IUCN status and estimated population
Gansu hamster	C. canus Allen, 1928	Central China	Size: 12–14 cm (5–6 in) long, plus 9–11 cm (4 in) tail Habitat: Forest Diet: Leaves and grasses	LC Unknown

Genus Cricetulus – A. Milne-Edwards, 1867 – three species
Common name	Scientific name and subspecies	Range	Size and ecology	IUCN status and estimated population
Chinese striped hamster	C. barabensis (Pallas, 1773)	Central and eastern Asia	Size: 7–13 cm (3–5 in) long, plus 1–4 cm (0.4–1.6 in) tail Habitat: Shrubland and grassland Diet: Shoots and seeds	LC Unknown
Long-tailed dwarf hamster	C. longicaudatus (A. Milne-Edwards, 1867)	Central Asia	Size: 8–14 cm (3–6 in) long, plus 3–5 cm (1–2 in) tail Habitat: Rocky areas Diet: Shoots and seeds	LC Unknown
Sokolov's dwarf hamster	C. sokolovi Orlov & Malygin, 1988	Mongolia and northern China	Size: 7–12 cm (3–5 in) long, plus 1–4 cm (0.4–1.6 in) tail Habitat: Shrubland and desert Diet: Shoots and seeds	LC Unknown

Genus Cricetus – Leske, 1779 – one species
Common name	Scientific name and subspecies	Range	Size and ecology	IUCN status and estimated population
European hamster	C. cricetus (Linnaeus, 1758)	Europe and western and central Asia	Size: 16–32 cm (6–13 in) long, plus 2–7 cm (1–3 in) tail Habitat: Shrubland and grassland Diet: Grains, beans, lentils, roots, and plant material, as well as insects and frogs	CR Unknown

Genus Nothocricetulus – Lebedev, Bannikova, Neumann, Ushakova, Ivanova, & Surov, 2018 – one species
Common name	Scientific name and subspecies	Range	Size and ecology	IUCN status and estimated population
Grey dwarf hamster	N. migratorius (Pallas, 1773)	Asia and eastern Europe	Size: 8–15 cm (3–6 in) long, plus 1–4 cm (0.4–1.6 in) tail Habitat: Forest, shrubland, grassland, and desert Diet: Shoots, seeds, and insects	LC Unknown

Genus Tscherskia – Ogniov, 1914 – one species
Common name	Scientific name and subspecies	Range	Size and ecology	IUCN status and estimated population
Greater long-tailed hamster	T. triton (De Winton, 1899)	Eastern Asia	Size: 14–22 cm (6–9 in) long, plus 6–11 cm (2–4 in) tail Habitat: Inland wetlands Diet: Seeds as well as shoots	LC Unknown

=== Tribe Mesocricetini ===
Genus Mesocricetus – Nehring, 1898 – four species
Common name	Scientific name and subspecies	Range	Size and ecology	IUCN status and estimated population
Ciscaucasian hamster	M. raddei (Nehring, 1894)	Southwestern Russia	Size: 14–22 cm (6–9 in) long, plus 1–2 cm (0.4–0.8 in) tail Habitat: Grassland Diet: Omnivorous, including a variety of vegetation, seeds, fruit, insects, and small vertebrates	LC Unknown
Golden hamster	M. auratus (Waterhouse, 1839)	Turkey and Syria	Size: 12–17 cm (5–7 in) long, plus 1–3 cm (0.4–1.2 in) tail Habitat: Grassland Diet: Omnivorous, including a variety of vegetation, seeds, fruit, insects, and small vertebrates	EN Unknown
Romanian hamster	M. newtoni (Nehring, 1898)	Bulgaria and Romania	Size: 13–16 cm (5–6 in) long, plus 1–3 cm (0.4–1.2 in) tail Habitat: Shrubland and grassland Diet: Omnivorous, including a variety of vegetation, seeds, fruit, insects, and small vertebrates	VU Unknown
Turkish hamster	M. brandti (Nehring, 1898)	Western Asia	Size: 13–20 cm (5–8 in) long, plus 1–4 cm (0.4–1.6 in) tail Habitat: Shrubland and grassland Diet: Omnivorous, including a variety of vegetation, seeds, fruit, insects, and small vertebrates	NT Unknown

=== Tribe Urocricetini ===
Genus Phodopus – Miller, 1910 – three species
Common name	Scientific name and subspecies	Range	Size and ecology	IUCN status and estimated population
Campbell's dwarf hamster	P. campbelli (Thomas, 1905)	East-central Asia	Size: 7–11 cm (3–4 in) long, plus 0.5–2 cm (0.2–0.8 in) tail Habitat: Shrubland and desert Diet: Seeds and plant material	LC Unknown
Roborovski dwarf hamster	P. roborovskii (Satunin, 1903)	East-central Asia	Size: 7–8 cm (3 in) long, plus 0.5–2 cm (0.2–0.8 in) tail Habitat: Desert and shrubland Diet: Seeds and plant material	LC Unknown
Winter white dwarf hamster	P. sungorus (Pallas, 1773)	Kazakhstan and southern Russia	Size: 7–9 cm (3–4 in) long, plus 0.5–1.5 cm (0.2–0.6 in) tail Habitat: Shrubland and desert Diet: Seeds and plant material	LC Unknown

Genus Urocricetus – Satunin, 1903 – two species
Common name	Scientific name and subspecies	Range	Size and ecology	IUCN status and estimated population
Kam dwarf hamster	U. kamensis Satunin, 1903	Central China	Size: 8–12 cm (3–5 in) long, plus 3–7 cm (1–3 in) tail Habitat: Grassland and inland wetlands Diet: Shoots and seeds	LC Unknown
Tibetan dwarf hamster	U. alticola (Thomas, 1917)	Western China	Size: 8–10 cm (3–4 in) long, plus 2–5 cm (1–2 in) tail Habitat: Forest, shrubland, and grassland Diet: Shoots and seeds	LC Unknown

== Sources ==
- Chernasky, Amy; Motis, Anna; Burgin, Connor, eds. (2023). All the Mammals of the World. Lynx Nature Books. ISBN 978-84-16728-66-4.
- Nowak, Ronald M. (1999). Walker's Mammals of the World. Vol. 2 (6th ed.). Johns Hopkins University Press. ISBN 978-0-8018-5789-8.
- Musser, Guy G.; Carleton, Michael D. (2005). Wilson, Don E.; Reeder, DeeAnn M. (eds.). Mammal Species of the World. Vol. 2 (3rd ed.). Johns Hopkins University Press. ISBN 978-0-8018-8221-0.
