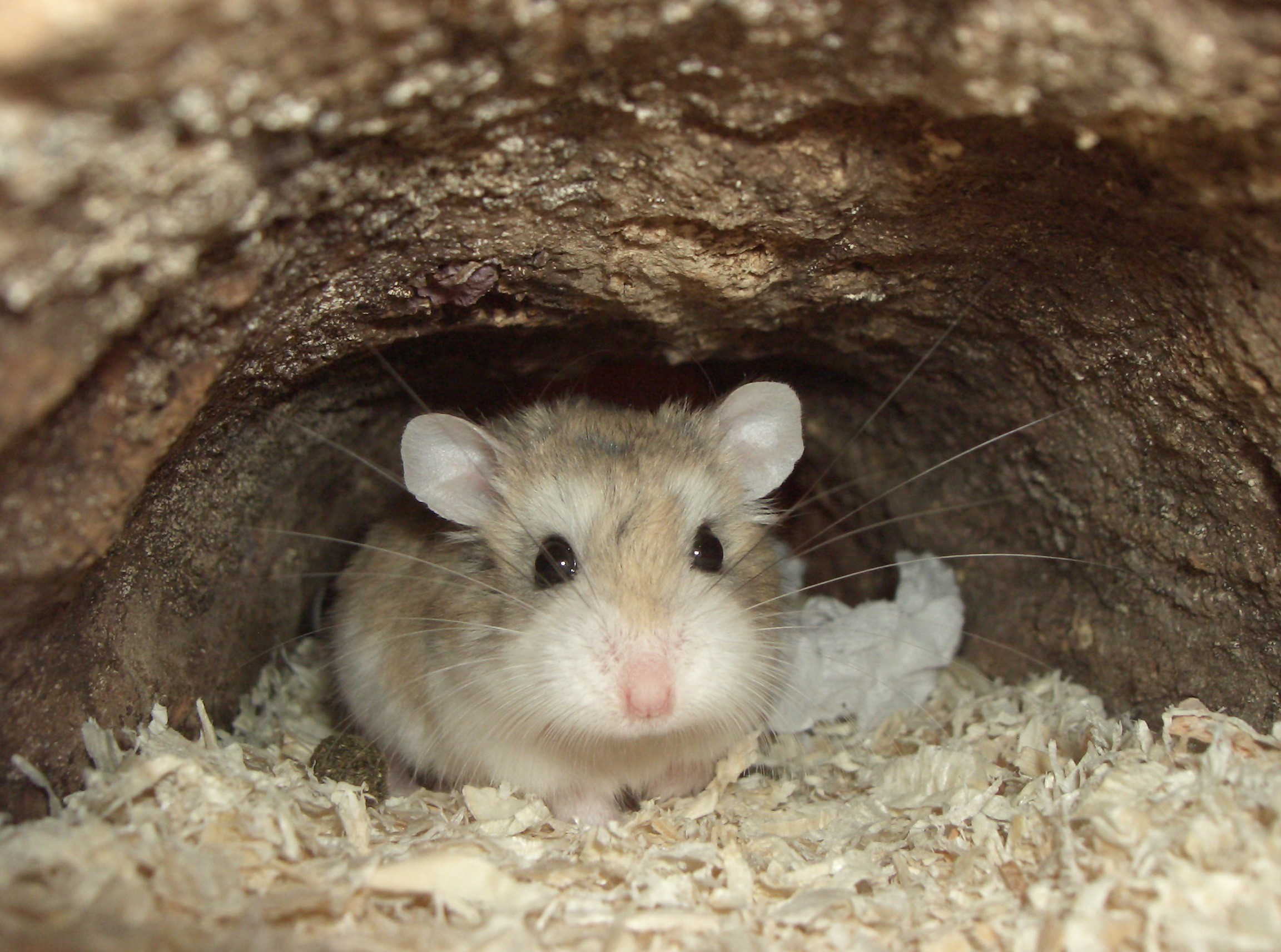
- Roborovski hamster (Phodopus roborovskii)

Scientific classification
- Kingdom: Animalia
- Phylum: Chordata
- Class: Mammalia
- Infraclass: Placentalia
- Order: Rodentia
- Family: Cricetidae
- Subfamily: Cricetinae
- Genus: Phodopus; Miller, 1910

Type species
- Cricetulus bedfordiae Thomas, 1908 (= Cricetulus roborovskii Satunin, 1903)

Species
- Phodopus campbelli (Thomas, 1905); Phodopus sungorus (Pallas, 1773); Phodopus roborovskii (Satunin, 1903)

= Phodopus =

Phodopus Temporal range: Pliocene–Recent

Genus of rodents

Phodopus, a genus of rodents in the hamster subfamily Cricetinae—a division of the larger family Cricetidae—is a lineage of small hamsters native to central Asia that display unusual adaptations to extreme temperatures. They are the only known hamsters that live in groups and, as shown in Phodopus campbelli, rely on significant contributions by males to the raising of offspring. They are nocturnal and active throughout the year; they do not hibernate. Species of Phodopus, together with members of the genera Cricetulus, Allocricetulus and Tscherskia are called dwarf hamsters because of their small size (roughly 7 to 10 centimetres or 2.8 to 3.9 inches) relative to other hamsters.

Like other hamsters, members of Phodopus have a round body shape, short tails and cheek pouches in which they can store food. They all live in dry conditions with extreme temperatures. They inhabit the forests, steppes and semi-deserts of Mongolia, Siberia, China and Kazakhstan. Fossils of Phodopus have been found in Pleistocene and Pliocene deposits in Europe and Asia.

Phodopus species are commonly sold as small pets. They are also used as laboratory organisms for a variety of studies, especially involving seasonal endocrine variation. Some species are considered to be agricultural pests.

All three species are widespread and probably abundant, and are assessed as Least Concern (LC) by the IUCN Red List, unlike their larger cousin, the golden hamster, which is also kept as a pet and is listed as Endangered (EN). However, their ecology and population dynamics are not well understood. Historical records indicate they were once common in places where they no longer occur. Consequently, they are listed in the Kazakhstan Government Regulation of Approval of Rare and Endangered Animal and Plant Species Index (2006).

== Systematics ==
Phodopus is one of seven genera within the subfamily Cricetinae, a group of rodents distributed throughout Eurasia. It contains hamsters distinguished from other hamsters by small size, short tails and fur covered feet. Fossils assignable to the genus occur in the Pleistocene in Europe and in the Late Pliocene of Kazakhstan, despite the fact that molecular data suggest the lineage is no younger than 8.5 million years.

Gerrit Smith Miller Jr. first described the genus Phodopus in 1910, designating Cricetulus bedfordiae as its type species. (C. bedfordiae is the species now called P. roborovskii.) The genus name derives from Ancient Greek φῳδός, phōdós (genitive of φῴς, phṓs) 'blister' and πούς, poús 'foot' and refers to the large pad on the sole of each foot.

Cladogram of Phodopus and related taxa based on two mitochondrial and one nuclear gene region.

Morphology has proved inadequate in providing characters for phylogenetic analyses of the subfamily Cricetinae, but the group appears to be monophyletic based on molecular analyses. The genus Phodopus is one of three well-supported lineages in Cricetinae, the other two being the genus Mesocricetus and the Cricetus-related group (Cricetus, Tscherskia, Allocricetulus, and Cricetulus). Analysis of chromosomes supports these three lineages. Phodopus is sister to all other Cricetinae (meaning that it is the first lineage to diverge in the clade). Using several molecular dating techniques, researchers have determined that the Phodopus lineage may have originated 8.5 to 12.2 million years ago (mya). Other genetic dating analyses suggest a somewhat earlier origination of 13.5–14.1 mya. Fossils assignable to the genus are unknown before about 2.5 million years ago, but failure to identify the remains accurately may contribute to the apparent lack of older fossils.

As shown in the cladogram, Phodopus roborovskii is sister to Phodopus campbelli + Phodopus sungorus. The validity of P. campbelli as a species has been controversial. Some biologists consider it to be a subspecies of P. sungorus. Neumann et al. determined that, at least for cytochrome b, P. campbelli and P. sungorus do not display the level of genetic divergence characteristic of sister rodent species. Both taxa have 2n=28 chromosomes. However, evidence from hybridization with P. sungorus has suggested to some researchers that they are in fact separate species.

P. roborovskii, on the other hand, has levels of genetic divergence from the other two taxa in the genus characteristic of genera among small mammals. P. roborovskii is also distinct from the other species morphologically (in its smaller body size and pelage, for example) and ecologically (preferring sandy, arid habitats). P. roborovskii has 2n=34 chromosomes. For these reasons, Neumann et al. suggest removing P. sungorus and P. campbelli to the genus Cricetiscus.

== Species ==
Biologists currently recognize three species of Phodopus: P. campbelli, P. sungorus and P. roborovskii. The validity of P. campbelli is in dispute, and it has sometimes been considered a subspecies of P. sungorus.

The species of Phodopus do not have stable common names, even among biologists. "Djungarian" (or "Dzhungarian" or "Zungarian") and "Siberian" have been applied to both P. sungorus and P. campbelli in the scientific literature, and all three species have been called "desert" hamsters as well.

P. sungorus is known as:

Djungarian [or Dzhungarian ] hamster
Russian white or Russian winter white hamster
winter white (dwarf) hamster
Siberian hamster
striped hairy-footed hamster
striped desert hamster

P. campbelli is known as:

Djungarian [or Dzhungarian] hamster
Campbell's (dwarf) hamster
Campbell's desert hamster

P. roborovskii is known as:

desert hamster
Roborovski (dwarf) hamster
Roborovski's desert hamster
Robo (dwarf) hamster

Below is a key to the four species of dwarf hamster commonly kept as pets. Some dwarf hamsters are albino, in which case they will be primarily white and the fur colour characteristics will not serve to distinguish them. The characteristics in brackets will allow identification using characters other than pelage, but the traits are generally comparative and are more difficult to assess. The key is based on Ross 1998.

- Has a visible tail. Foot pads not fur covered. → Cricetulus griseus
- Has no visible tail, or at most a very short tail typical of hamsters. Foot pads fur covered.
  - Back without a dark stripe running from head to tail. Sides show a sharp transition from darker upper body fur to lighter under body fur. [Body size very small, head rounded when observed from above. Cusps and re-entrant folds of the upper and lower molars directly opposite. Feet with one large pad on the bottom surface.] → Phodopus roborovskii
  - Back with a dark stripe running from head to tail. Sides show darker upper body fur intergrading into lighter under body fur, forming a wave-like (or arched) interface. (If the hamster is all white, but the eyes are dark (not red) it is most likely P. sungorus in its winter pelage.) [Body size typical for dwarf hamsters, head rectangular when observed from above. Cusps and re-entrant folds of the upper and lower molars directly alternate. Feet with three pads on the bottom surface.]
    - Dark patch on the crown of the head. Fur on the under body is white at the base. No yellow or buffy highlights on the sides where the darker upper body fur meets the lighter underbody fur. [Ears small.] → Phodopus sungorus
    - Dark patch on crown of head lacking. Fur on the under body is slate gray at the base. May have yellow or buffy highlights on the sides where the darker upper body fur meets the lighter under body fur. [Ears larger.] → Phodopus campbelli

=== Campbell's dwarf hamster ===
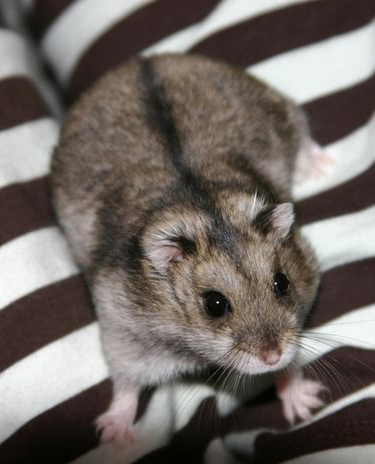
Phodopus campbelli

Phodopus campbelli: The lips and cheeks have white fur, and the region around the ears is grey. A dark dorsal stripe runs from the base of the neck to the base of the tail. The fur on the throat, abdomen and legs is white, and the fur on top of the paws is silvery white. When the cheek pouches are full, they extend back to the shoulders. The average body mass is 23.4 grams (0.8 oz).

=== Winter white dwarf hamster ===
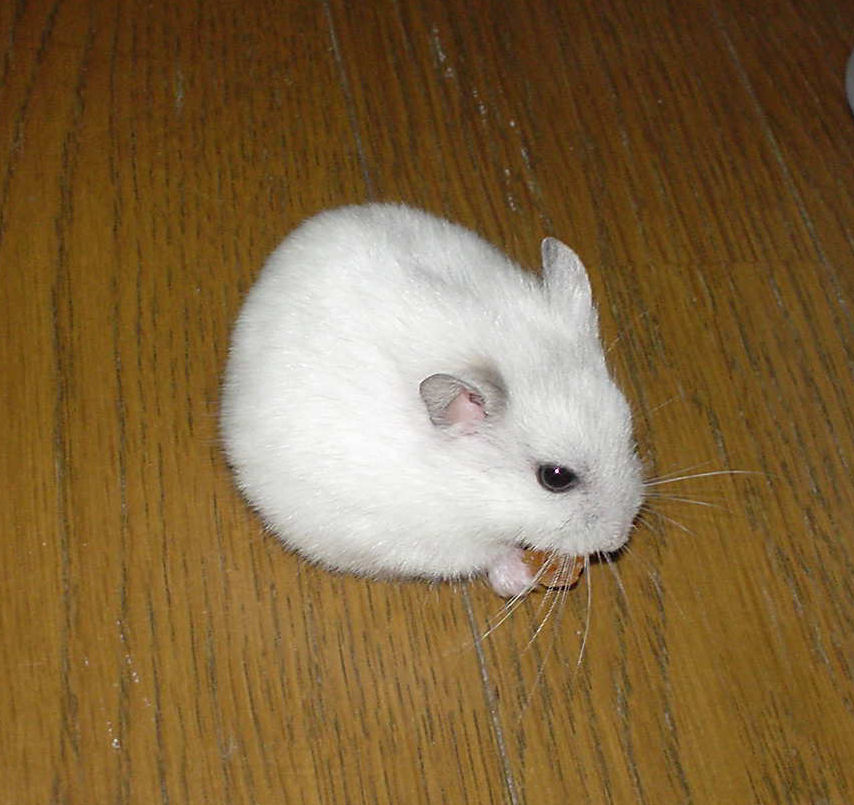
Phodopus sungorus

Phodopus sungorus: In the summer, the face is brown, which is slightly lighter than the fur around the mouth and ears. The rest of the head is dark brown with a black rim around each eye. A dark brown dorsal stripe runs from the back of the head to the base of the tail. The feet, tail, throat and abdomen are white, and the back is ash grey to dark brown.

=== Roborovski hamster ===
Phodopus roborovskii is the smallest species of Phodopus and of hamsters in general. The feet are unusually short, broad and densely hairy. The fur on the abdomen is grey, and the coat colour turns grey during moulting.

== Adaptations to extreme environments ==
Phodopus species display a variety of morphological, physiological and behavioral adaptations to seasonal temperature extremes and aridity. To survive the exceptional cold of winter, they have evolved spherical, compact bodies with excellent insulation, including both fur and fat. Water is scarce in both summer and winter, and these hamsters have developed an excellent ability to conserve water by maintaining low evaporative water loss rates and concentrating urine.

During periods of extreme cold (below -20 °C), P. sungorus adopts a characteristic hunched posture, with its head and forepaws tucked under its belly. It fluffs its fur evenly, increasing its insulating quality. During periods of high heat (greater than 30 °C), this species flattens itself on its belly, with all four limbs splayed to the side. It grooms its fur into clumps, creating "ventilation gaps" between them.

Sociality has been considered an adaptation to the extreme environment, as well.

== Diet ==
In the wild, Phodopus primarily collect and eat seeds and dry fruits. They also eat other plant parts and insects.

== Habitats and conservation status ==
Phodopus species inhabit the mountainous forests, steppes, and semideserts of Mongolia and the adjacent areas of China, northeast Kazakhstan, and the southern part of the West Siberian lowlands of Tuva and Dauria. All three species are widespread, although some isolated local populations exist. All three species are probably abundant and are assessed as Least Concern (LC) in the IUCN Red List. They all occur to some extent in protected areas, at least in Mongolia, and are not thought to face significant threats to their existence. Because the status and dynamics of their populations are uncertain, some species are treated as species of concern (for example, the government of Kazakhstan requires monitoring of P. roborovskii)

Some species are clearly diminished in range and may have been extirpated as agricultural pests or by habitat destruction.

== Interactions with humans ==
Since some populations and species of Phodopus, such as P. campbelli, inhabit areas with sparse human population and little potential for agriculture, they have little interaction with humans. Others, such as P. sungorus, have been perceived as significant agricultural pests.

Dwarf hamsters were introduced into the pet trade in the 1970s. They are considered excellent pets, especially for novice pet owners, because they are easy to maintain (requiring no special diet or conditions), are generally not aggressive to people, and tolerate living with other members of their species.

Phodopus species have developed into important laboratory organisms. They provide an excellent model system for the evolution of hormonal control of photoperiod and seasonal physiological and behavioral changes, sociality, and behavioral ecology. Because Phodopus species have small chromosome numbers with easily distinguished chromosomes, they have been used for cytogenetic and cancer research. Because of their extreme cold tolerance, they have been used to study thermoregulation. One population of laboratory animals developed both glycosuria and ketonuria independently and has been used as a model for diabetes mellitus.

The first laboratory use of Phodopus stemmed from a breeding colony established in Leningrad at the Zoological Institute of the Academy of Sciences of the Soviet Union. The animals became the seed stock from which other European lab colonies were started. The animals were said to have been trapped in Tuva and Siberia and were labeled as P. sungorus campbelli. Both P. sungorus and P. campbelli are popular research animals, especially as they differ enough in behavior and physiology to support fruitful comparison studies. More recently, P. roborovskii became an important research animal, as well.
