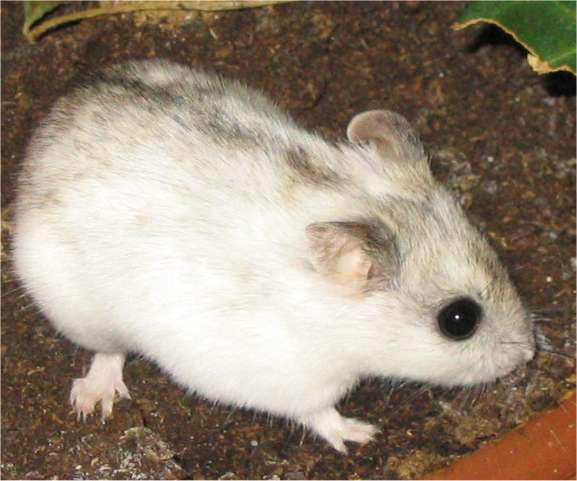
- Chinese hamster, white-spotted type

Scientific classification
- Kingdom: Animalia
- Phylum: Chordata
- Class: Mammalia
- Order: Rodentia
- Family: Cricetidae
- Subfamily: Cricetinae
- Genus: Cricetulus; A. Milne-Edwards, 1867

Type species
- Cricetulus griseus A. Milne-Edwards, 1867 (= Mus barabensis Pallas, 1773)

Species
- See text.

= Cricetulus =

Cricetulus Temporal range: Late Miocene to Recent

Genus of rodents

Cricetulus is a genus of rodent in the family Cricetidae (voles and hamsters); it has seven member species that inhabit arid or semi-arid regions in Eurasia.

They tend to be more ratlike in appearance than typical hamsters, hence the common name ratlike hamster. Many of the species are considered dwarf hamsters. However, members of the genera Allocricetulus, Tscherskia, and Cansumys are often called ratlike hamsters, and so are considered to be members of the genus Cricetulus by many authorities.

== Species ==
Three species are universally accepted in this genus:

- Cricetulus barabensis — Chinese striped hamster
- Cricetulus longicaudatus — long-tailed dwarf hamster
- Cricetulus sokolovi — Sokolov's dwarf hamster

Two species were moved to the genus Urocricetus in 2018, but have historically been included in this genus:

- Urocricetus alticola — Tibetan dwarf hamster
- Urocricetus kamensis — Kam dwarf hamster

Other species are sometimes recognized, but further research is likely needed to consider them valid:

- Cricetulus griseus — usually considered a synonym of Cricetulus barabensis
- Cricetulus lama — considered a synonym of Urocricetus kamensis by the American Society of Mammalogists, but considered valid by the IUCN
- Cricetulus tibetanus — considered a synonym of Urocricetus kamensis by the American Society of Mammalogists, but considered valid by the IUCN

Additionally, the grey dwarf hamster Nothocricetulus migratorius was included in this genus until 2018.

== See also ==
- Phodopus, other dwarf hamsters
