= List of hamsters =

Hamsters (subfamily Cricetinae) are small rodents classified in the family Cricetidae, part of the order Rodentia. It may also refer to mouse-like hamsters, members of the sibling family Calomyscidae.

- For members of the subfamily Cricetinae (hamsters), see List of cricetines
- For members of the family Calomyscidae (mouse-like hamsters), see mouse-like hamsters § Species
