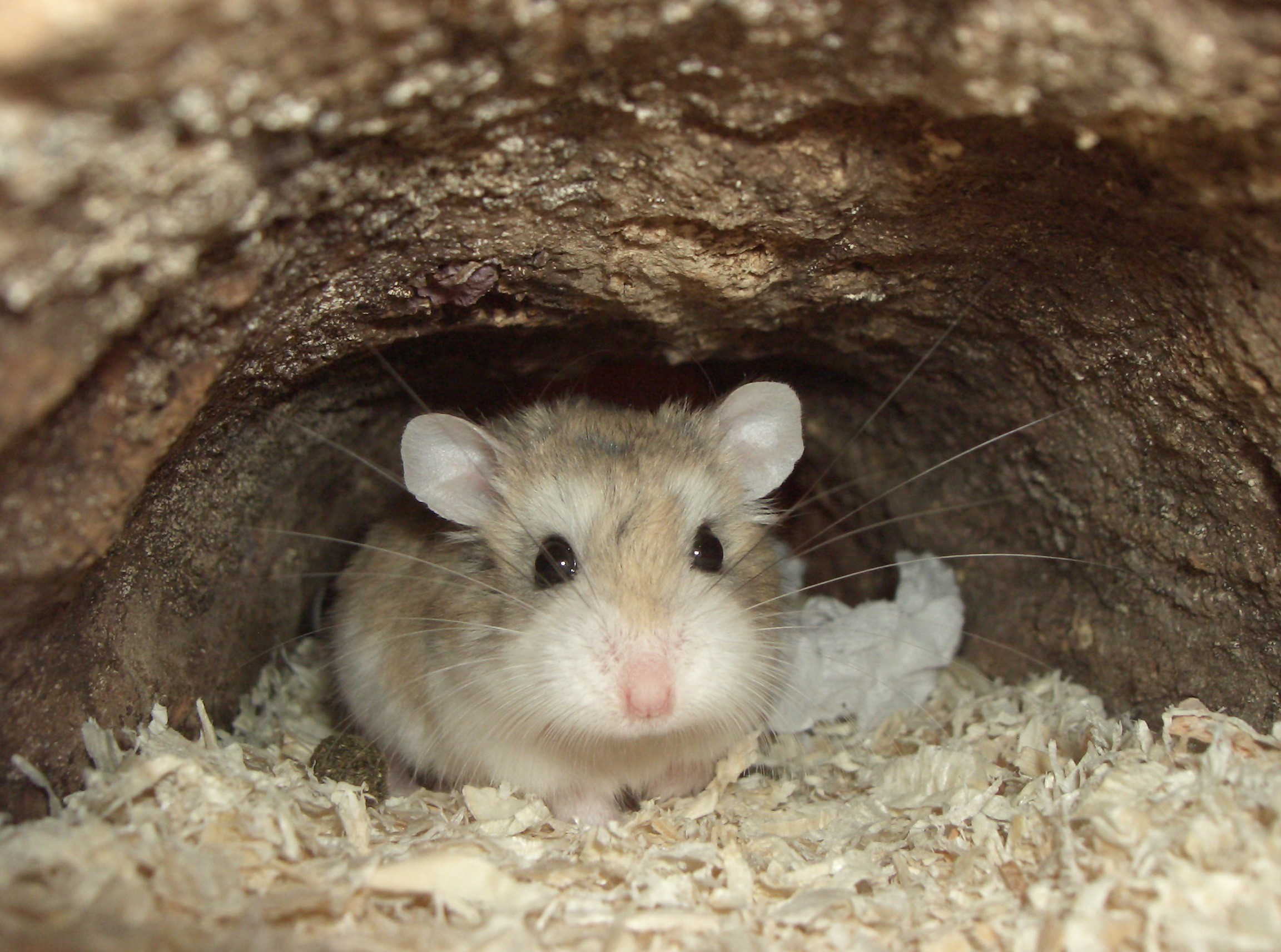

Conservation status
- Least Concern (IUCN 3.1)

Scientific classification
- Kingdom: Animalia
- Phylum: Chordata
- Class: Mammalia
- Order: Rodentia
- Family: Cricetidae
- Subfamily: Cricetinae
- Genus: Phodopus
- Species: P. roborovskii

Binomial name
- Phodopus roborovskii (Satunin, 1903)
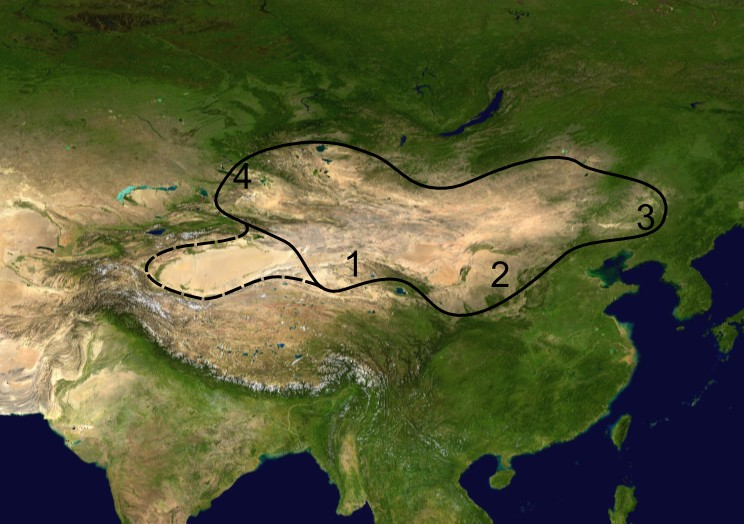
- Distribution of P. roborovskii

Synonyms
- Cricetulus roborovskii Satunin, 1903; Cricetulus bedfordiae Thomas, 1908; Phodopus praedilectus Mori, 1930; Phodopus przhewalskii Vorontsov & Krjukova, 1969

= Roborovski dwarf hamster =

Roborovski hamster

Species of rodent

The Roborovski hamster (Phodopus roborovskii), also known as the desert hamster, Robo dwarf hamster or simply dwarf hamster is the smallest of three species of hamster in the genus Phodopus, and is native to the deserts of Central Asia. They average 1.6 cm (0.6 in) in length at birth and grow to be 6.3 cm (2.5 in) in length and 16 g (0.56 oz) in weight in adulthood. Distinguishing characteristics of the Roborovskis are eyebrow-like white spots and the lack of any dorsal stripe (found on the other members of the genus Phodopus). The average lifespan for the Roborovski hamster is 2–4 years, though this is dependent on living conditions (extremes being four years in captivity and two in the wild). Roborovskis are known for their speed and have been said to run up to 6 miles a night. The common name and scientific name honor the Russian explorer Vsevolod Ivanovich Roborovsky, who collected the holotype of this species.

== Distribution and habitat ==
Roborovski hamsters are found in desert regions, such as the basin of the lake Zaysan in Kazakhstan and regions of Tuva, Mongolia and Xinjiang in China. The hamsters inhabit areas of loose sand and sparse vegetation and are rarely found in areas of dense vegetation and solid clay substrates. They live at elevations of around 1,200 metres (3,900 ft)–1,450 metres (4,760 ft) and although research has been carried out, no fossil record exists for this species. Their efficient use of water makes them particularly suited to the steppe and desert regions they inhabit. They dig and live in burrows with steep tunnels as deep as six feet underground. In the wild, Roborovski hamsters are crepuscular, being most active at dawn and dusk.

The Roborovski hamster has been found to be more common in the southern area of its distribution range, in areas such as Yulin, Shaanxi, China. It has been reported as a common sighting by locals in this city and in the sand dunes of the Ordos Desert.

=== Diet ===
They are omnivorous; they primarily eat grains, vegetables, fruit, and plants, but they will also eat meat and insects when present. Roborovski hamsters remain underground in winter and survive in that season by stockpiling some food in warmer weather and storing it in special food chambers within their burrow system. In the Chinese province of Shaanxi it is known for foraging millet seeds.

In Mongolia, insects like beetles, earwigs and crickets are part of its diet. According to Formosow the stock of several burrows indicate an almost insect-based diet. Also the consumption of snails has been reported.

In Tuva, the share of animal food is marginal. It primarily lives on the seed of the sand alyssum, nitre bush, Siberian peashrub, Dracocephalum peregrinum, and milkvetch as well as sedges during the summer-months. Vegetative plant parts are not of significance. Flint and Golowkin determined in 1958 and 1959 that nearly 100 percent of the cheek pouches' content consisted of plant food, whereas animal food was only found in 23 percent of the hamsters' pouches at all in 1958 and 32 percent in 1959.

The daily dietary intake of the Roborovski hamster heavily depends on its body weight. Juveniles have higher intakes of food compared to their weight than adult hamsters. Based on its population structure, Wan et al. calculated an average food intake of ca. two grams of plant seeds per day. They specify the functional relation between the daily food intake (N) and the body-weight (M) to be $N = (1{,}422 \cdot \ln (M / \text{gram}) - 1{,}780) \text{ gram}$

Pups, juveniles, and adult hamsters have all been found to forage for food in their burrows.

== History of human contact ==
Russian expeditioner Lt. Vsevolod Roborovski first made note of these hamsters, discovering them on an expedition in July 1894, though they were not studied scientifically for the best part of another decade, until Konstantin A. Satunin made observations in 1903. The London Zoo imported them into the UK in the 1960s, but the first Roborovski hamsters studied in Britain were imported in the 1970s from Moscow Zoo. (None of them, however, bore offspring.) Continental European countries had more success in breeding some Roborovskis, and those currently in the UK are descendants of a batch imported from the Netherlands in 1990. They were imported to the US in 1998, though they are now commonly found in pet shops in several countries. In South Korea, they are almost as common as the Winter White Russian dwarf hamster.

== Variation ==
The Roborovski hamster is distinguished from the Djungarian hamster (Phodopus sungorus) and Campbell's dwarf hamster (Phodopus campbelli) due to its smaller size, sandy coloration of fur and its lack of a dorsal stripe. When observed from behind, the neurocranium is rounded and does not appear to be as rectangular as Phodopus campbelli and Phodopus sungorus. The cusps of the lower molars are directly opposite and not alternate, as seen in other members of the genus, and the incisive foramen of the Roborovski hamster is greater than 4 millimetres (0.16 in) in length and is shorter than the length of the upper tooth row, which is uncharacteristic of the other two members of the genus.

Currently, 10 variations of Roborovski hamsters are thought to exist. Only one is standardised in the UK as of 2018 as per UK National Hamster Council, with 4 genes recognised and others still under dispute.

- Agouti — a natural grayish-brown with white underside and "eyebrows" (white over eyes)
- White face — a dominant mutation producing an agouti-coloured hamster with a white face
- Husky — a recessive mutation producing a white-faced hamster with a paler, more dilute top coat and no dilution on the undercoat.
- "mottled" or "pied" — both dominant and recessive mutations have been identified, these hamsters are white with the agouti colouring (or husky/blue/black/cinnamon) in irregular patches over their heads, bodies and sometimes their faces.
- Head spot — a combination of the dominant and recessive pied genes that creates a pure white animal with one patch of colour on the head
- White-from-white-faced or dark-eared white — a combination of the dominant white-faced gene and the husky gene that produces a white hamster that retains a greyish undercoat and ears.
- White-from-pied or pure white — is allegedly a combination of the two pied genes producing a white hamster. Note that two recessive pied genes do not make white.
- Black-eyed white is a new gene that has proven not to be white from pied or white from white-faced. This gene is still being explored.
- Red-eyed — a recessive mutation that produces a cinnamon-coloured hamster with a chocolate undercoat, dark red eyes, and pale ears. Adding pied to a cinnamon gives brighter red eyes. This is not the same mutation as 'brown eye' or rust.
- Black/blue - Originally bred in Finland, going to the Netherlands and then Germany. Black and blue are two recessive genes still being investigated. These genes came to the UK in 2017 via Doric Hamstery and the first UK litter of blacks were born there Spring 2018. Both are thought to be self colours behaving like melanistic and its further dilution to blue that is already found in other species.

Breeding in captivity has also produced a darker variation of the naturally sandy-coloured agouti fur. According to Fox (2006) white-faced and derived breeds are considered torture-breeding and therefore breeding them is forbidden by law in several European countries like Germany or Austria. The homozygous carrier of the gene variant causes neurological symptoms similar to the whirling disease, where the animal spins itself around until it dies of exhaustion.

This concern is not seen in recessive white face (husky).

== Breeding ==
The sex of a Roborovski is determined visually; female openings are very close together and may even look like a single opening, while male openings are further apart. Males usually have a visible scent gland near the navel above the two openings, appearing as a yellow stain in older animals.

The breeding season for the Roborovski hamster is between April and September. Gestation lasts from 20 and 22 days, producing three to four litters. The litter size is between three and nine, with an average of six. Captive-bred Roborovski often breed year round.

The offspring weigh 1 gram (0.035 oz) at birth. At birth, the offspring have no fur, the incisors and claws are visible, but the eyes, pinnae of the ear and digits are all sealed. After three days the whiskers become visible, and after five days the first dorsal hairs develop. The digits separate after six days, and after eleven days the body is completely formed. The young hamsters open their eyes by day 14.

== As pets ==
Roborovski hamsters have become increasingly popular as pets in recent years. Their increased activity levels that lead to a high stress predisposition and decreased ease of handling when compared to other domestic hamster species. However, they can be tamed with time.

On average, Roborovski hamsters will live 26 to 36 months in captivity.

Although claimed to be hypoallergenic, Roborovski hamsters have been associated with the development of asthma in previously asymptomatic owners.

In rare emergency situations, a shallow dish of warm water may be necessary to clean harmful substances from a hamster's fur; however, under normal circumstances, hamsters should never be bathed in water as, aside from being incredibly stressful, this can remove vital protective oils from their coat, which can be dangerous and potentially fatal. Hamsters frequently groom themselves, and instead of water, a sand bath should be offered to help them stay clean and healthy.

== In film ==
The short film Roborovski, about a hamster, co-written and directed by Tilda Cobham-Hervey and Dev Patel, premiered at Flickerfest in Sydney in January 2020, and won several awards at the Antipodean Film Festival in Saint Tropez, France, in 2021.

== Gallery ==
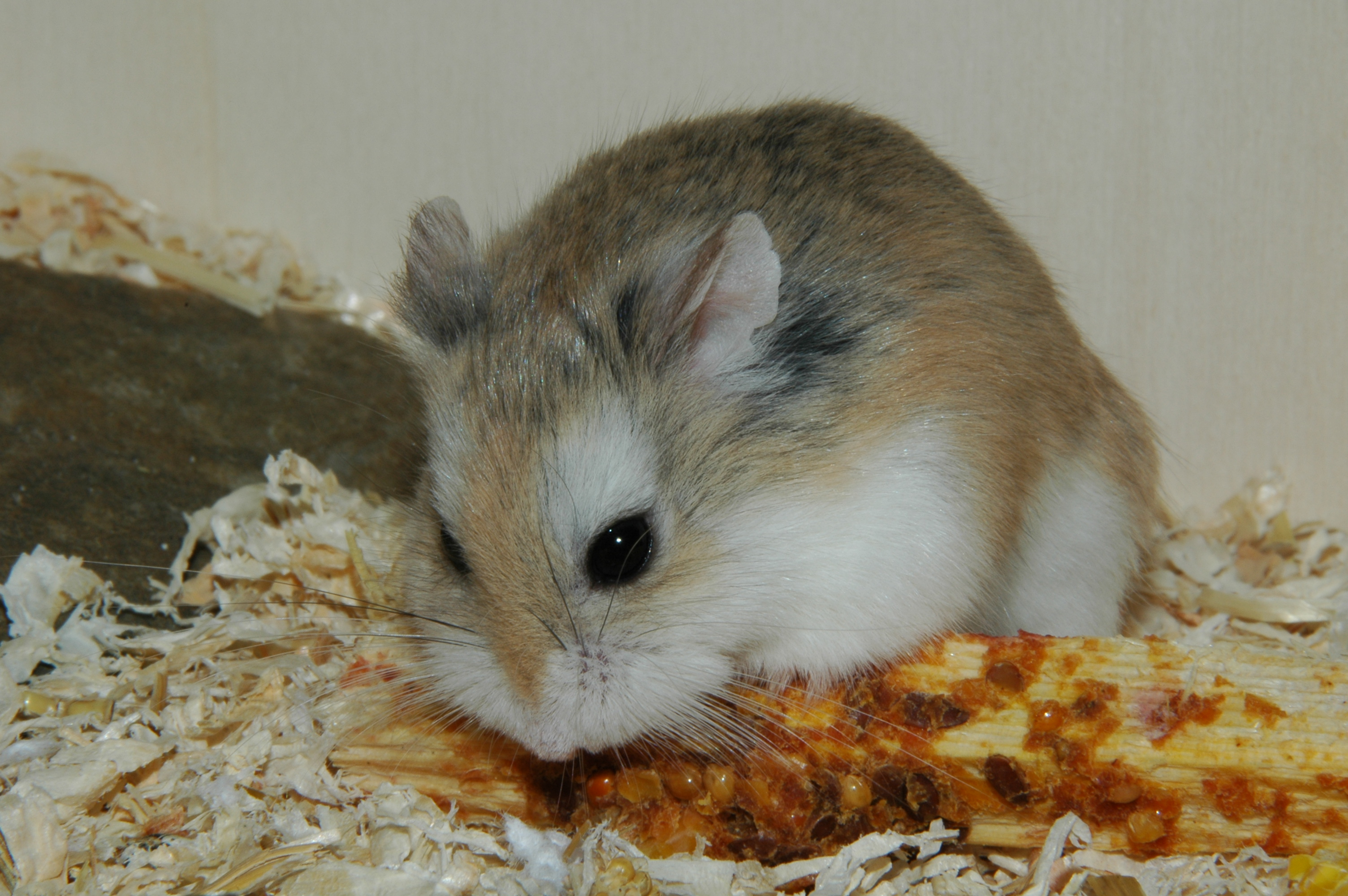

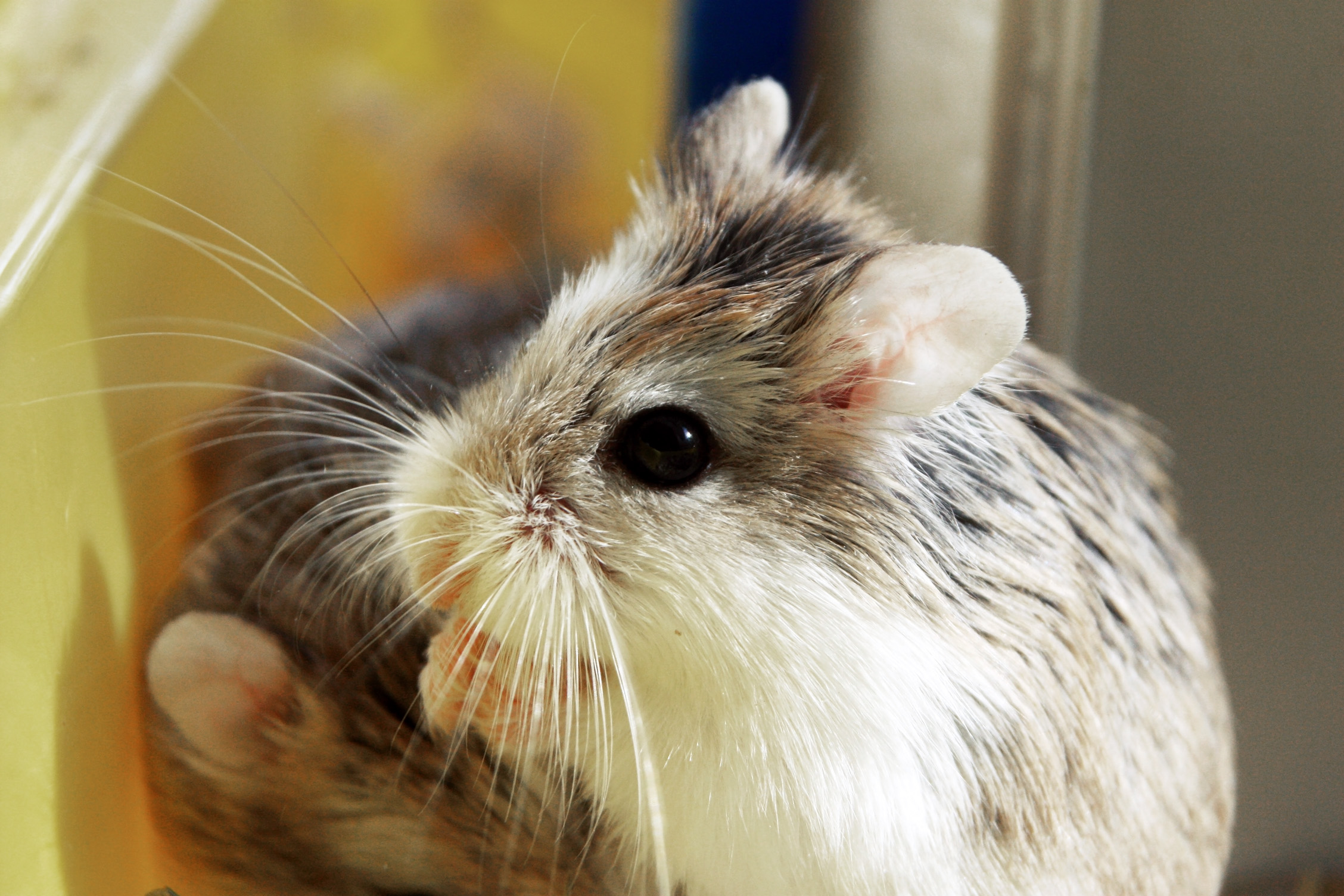

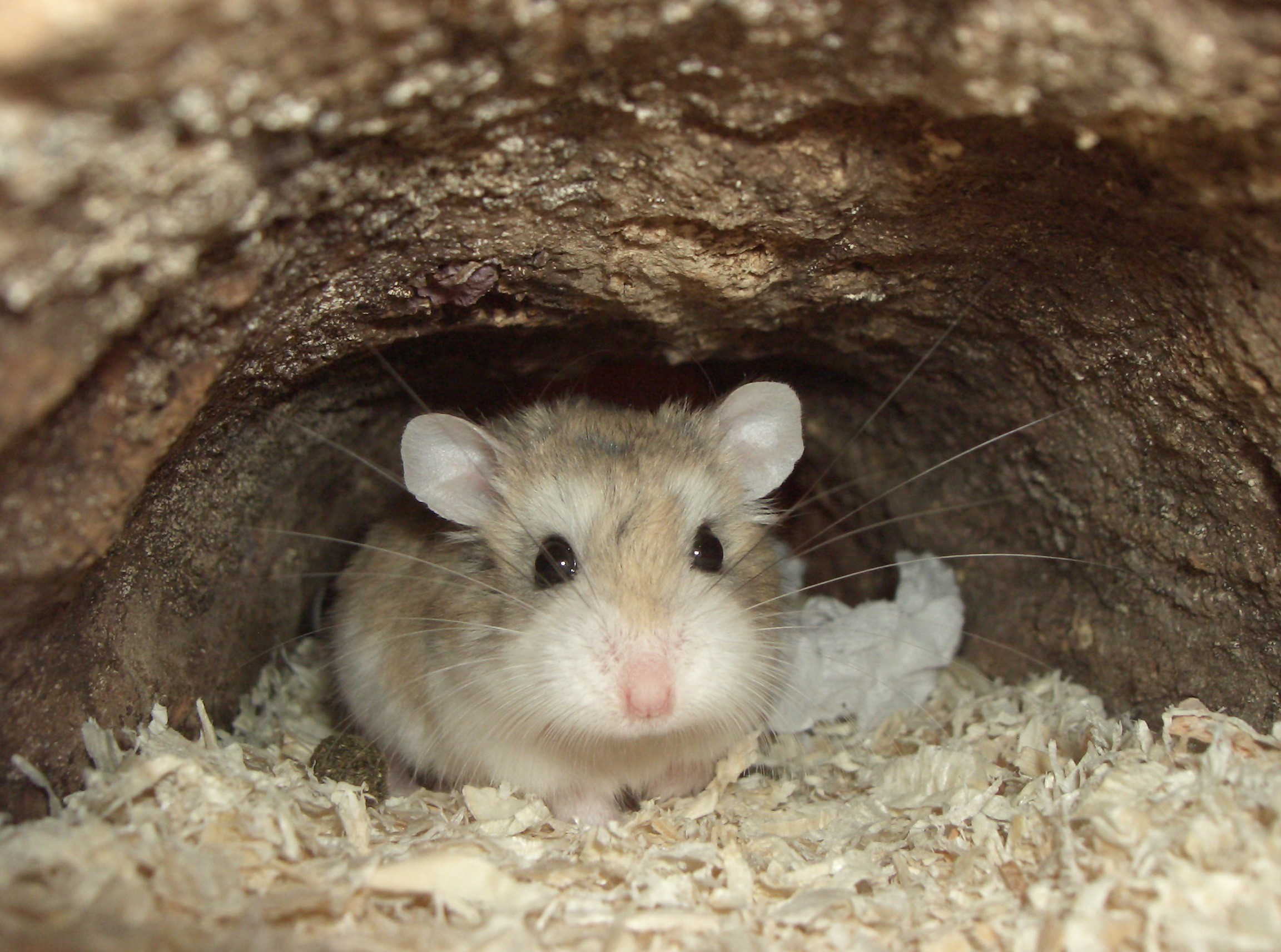

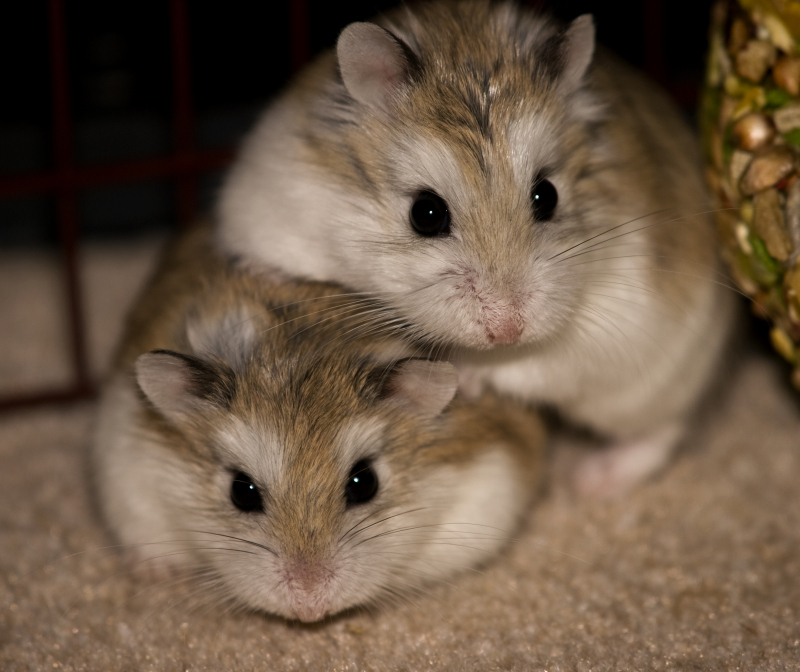

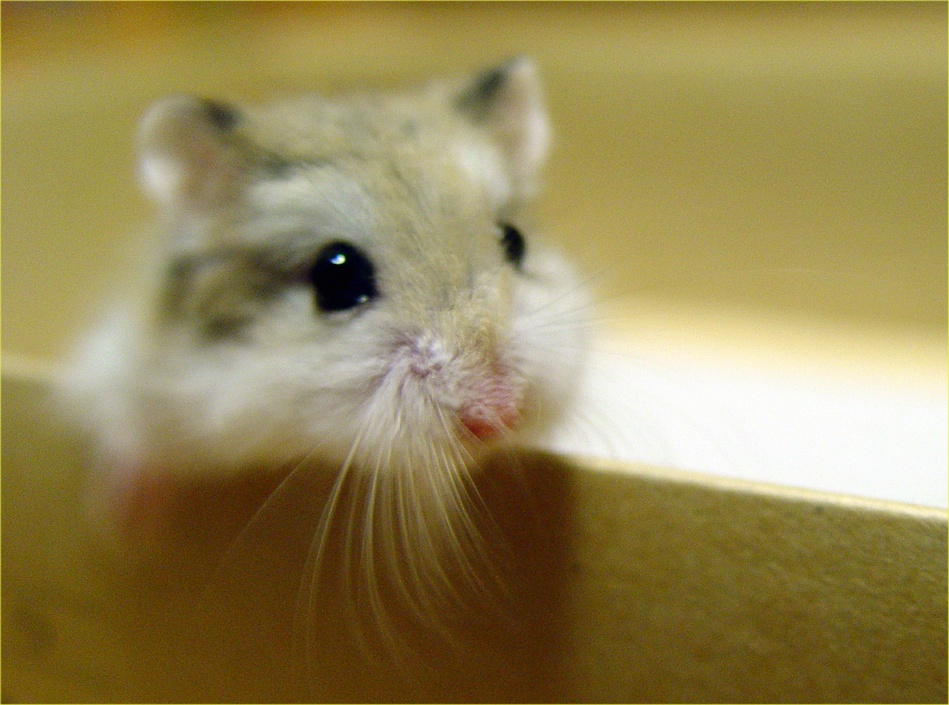

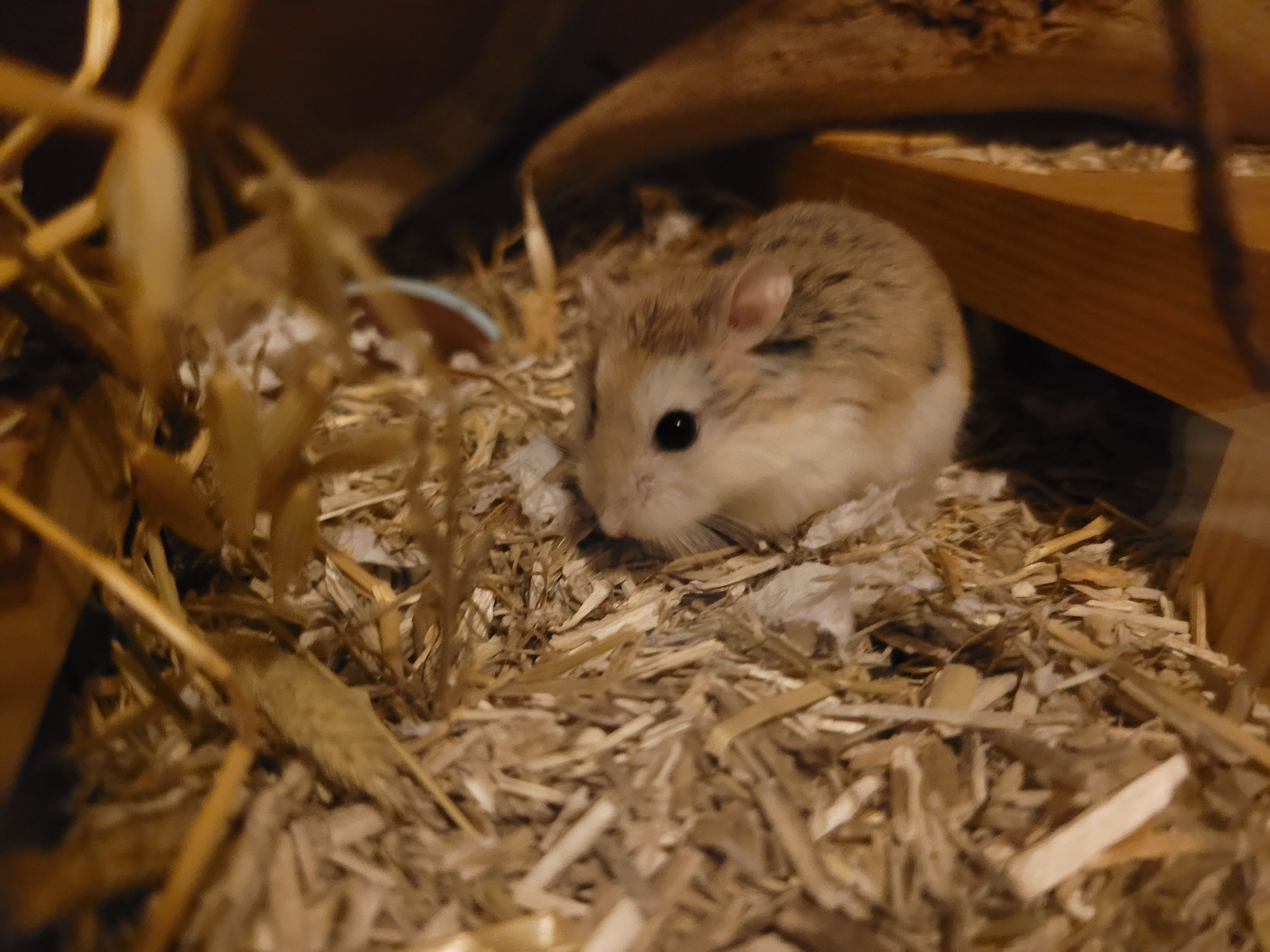
