= Russian hamster =

Russian hamster may refer to:

- the Campbell's dwarf hamster (Phodopus campbelli)
- the winter white dwarf hamster (Phodopus sungorus)
