= Sokolov's dwarf hamster =

Conservation status
- Least Concern (IUCN 3.1)

Scientific classification
- Kingdom: Animalia
- Phylum: Chordata
- Class: Mammalia
- Infraclass: Placentalia
- Order: Rodentia
- Family: Cricetidae
- Subfamily: Cricetinae
- Genus: Cricetulus
- Species: C. sokolovi

Binomial name
- Cricetulus sokolovi Orlov & Malygin, 1988

Species of rodent

Sokolov's dwarf hamster (Cricetulus sokolovi) is a species of rodent in the hamster and vole family Cricetidae. Previously listed as conspecific with Chinese striped hamster, it has been listed as a separate species since 1988. It has a distinctive dark stripe down its back on and otherwise grey body. It is found in China and Mongolia, and lives in burrows beneath desert shrubs.

== Taxonomy ==
Cricetulus sokolovi was previously attributed to C. barabensis obscurus, but was elevated to species status in 1988 due to differences in its chromosomes and fur. It is named after Russian zoologist Vladimir E. Sokolov.

== Description ==
Its fur is grey with a brown-yellow hue. A dark stripe runs from the back of a specimen's neck to the base of its tail. This stripe is seen more easily in younger animals and fades with age. Its feet are white and its toes curl upwards. Its ears are the same color as its fur, with a dark grey spot in the inside middle. It has a head and body length of between 77–114 millimetres (3.0–4.5 in), tail length of 18–32 millimetres (0.71–1.26 in) and ear length of 13–19 millimetres (0.51–0.75 in). The skull is on average between 23–26 millimetres (0.91–1.02 in) long.

== Habitat ==
Sokolov's dwarf hamster prefers to live in burrows built under desert shrubs in sandy areas. It is found in western and southern Mongolia, including in the northern and eastern Gobi, and in central Inner Mongolia in northern China.

In Mongolia, its main geographical threats are droughts and the drying of water sources. Six percent of its known range in Mongolia is within protected areas.

== Reproduction ==
Reproduction begins in mid-May with two or three litters of between four and nine young produced annually.
