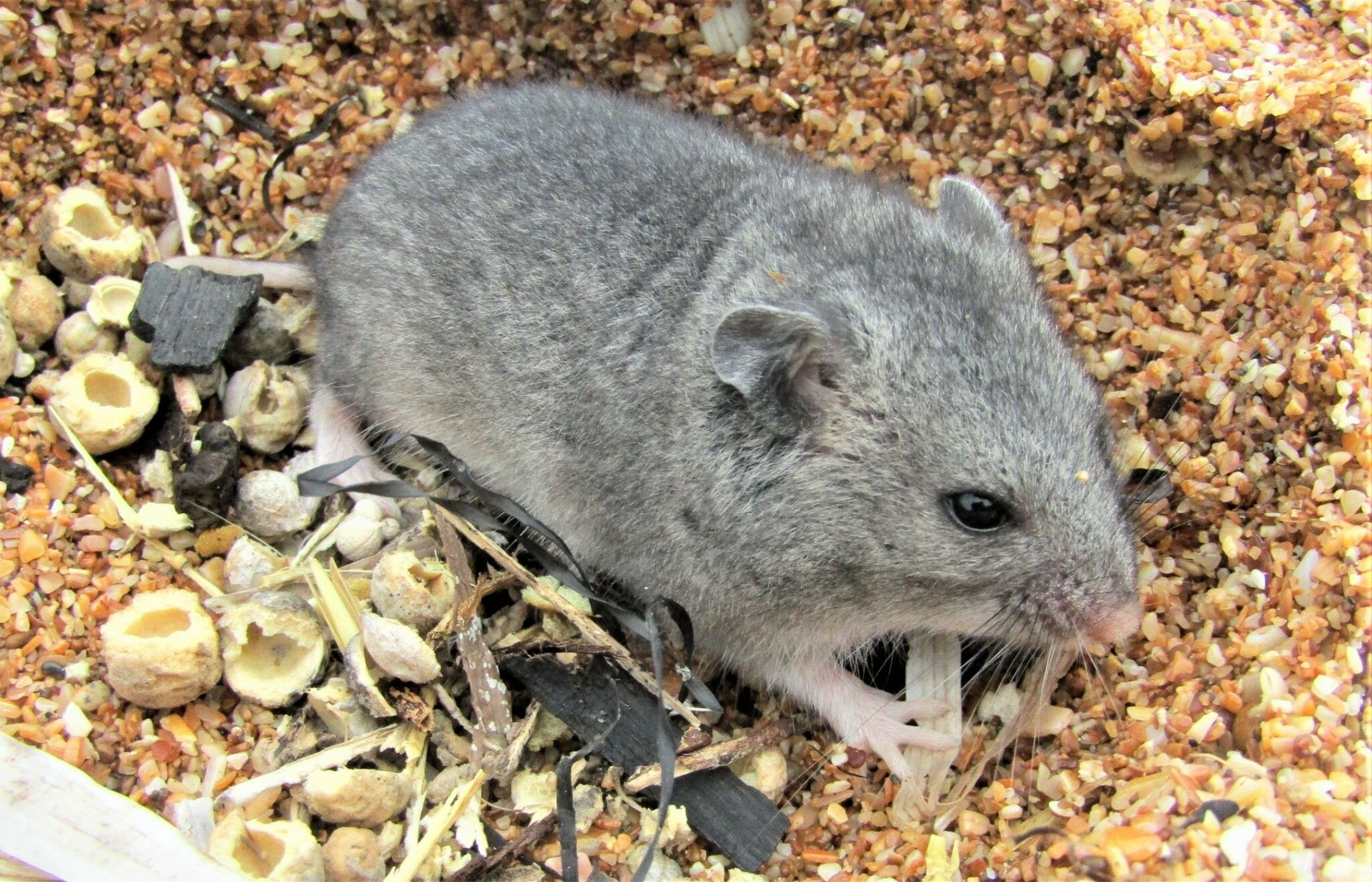

Conservation status
- Least Concern (IUCN 3.1)

Scientific classification
- Kingdom: Animalia
- Phylum: Chordata
- Class: Mammalia
- Order: Rodentia
- Family: Cricetidae
- Subfamily: Cricetinae
- Genus: Nothocricetulus; Lebedev et al., 2018
- Species: N. migratorius

Binomial name
- Nothocricetulus migratorius (Pallas, 1773)

Synonyms
- Mus migratorius Pallas, 1773; Cricetus migratorius (Pallas, 1773); Cricetulus migratorius (Pallas, 1773)

= Grey dwarf hamster =

Species of rodent

The grey dwarf hamster, grey hamster or migratory hamster (Nothocricetulus migratorius) is a species of rodent in the family Cricetidae. Its range extends from Eastern Europe through the Middle East, Russia and Central Asia to Mongolia and western China. The grey dwarf hamster has grey fur and a head-body length ranging from 85 to 120 mm (3.3 to 4.7 in). The International Union for Conservation of Nature has assessed its conservation status as being of "least concern".

== Taxonomy ==
Originally thought to be part of the genus Cricetulus, it has recently been moved to its own genus, Nothocricetulus.

== Description ==
The grey dwarf hamster has a head and body length of between 85 and 120 mm (3.3–4.7 in) and a well-furred tail about one third as long as this. It weighs between 31 and 58 g (1.1–2.0 oz). Its dental formula is 1.0.0.31.0.3.3. It is a sandy brownish-grey colour above with whitish underparts, the white hairs often having gray bases. The ears are large and the skull flattened with a narrow rostrum.

== Distribution ==
The grey dwarf hamster is found in parts of Eastern Europe and Asia including Afghanistan, Armenia, Bulgaria, China, Iran, Iraq, Israel, Jordan, Kazakhstan, Lebanon, Moldova, Mongolia, Pakistan, Romania, Russia, Turkey, and Ukraine. It has been recorded from Greece but has not been seen there since about 1970. It mostly lives above 1,000 m (3,300 ft) and in the Pamir Mountains has been recorded at altitudes of up to 4,300 m (14,100 ft). It originally inhabited dry grasslands, arid steppes and semi-deserts, but it has spread into cultivated land and gardens, and even sometimes into buildings. It avoids moist locations, dense woodland and forests and is most common in sparsely vegetated areas.

== Behaviour ==
The grey dwarf hamster is active at dusk and at night. It digs a deep burrow complex that may extend 150 cm (59 in) beneath the surface of the ground and which includes side passages, several nesting areas and chambers to store food for use in winter. It forages for roots, the green parts of plants and seeds, and also eats insects. It does not hibernate, breeding taking place during the summer, with up to three litters being produced annually. Litter size is usually six or seven, but ranges from one to thirteen.

== Status ==
The grey dwarf hamster has a very wide range and a large total population. In some areas such as the Balkans it is rare, but in others it is abundant, being more common than the house mouse (Mus musculus) in Armenia and Kyrgyzstan. The population trend is unknown, but no particular threats have been identified and it is present in many protected areas. The International Union for Conservation of Nature has therefore assessed this hamster's conservation status as being of "least concern".
