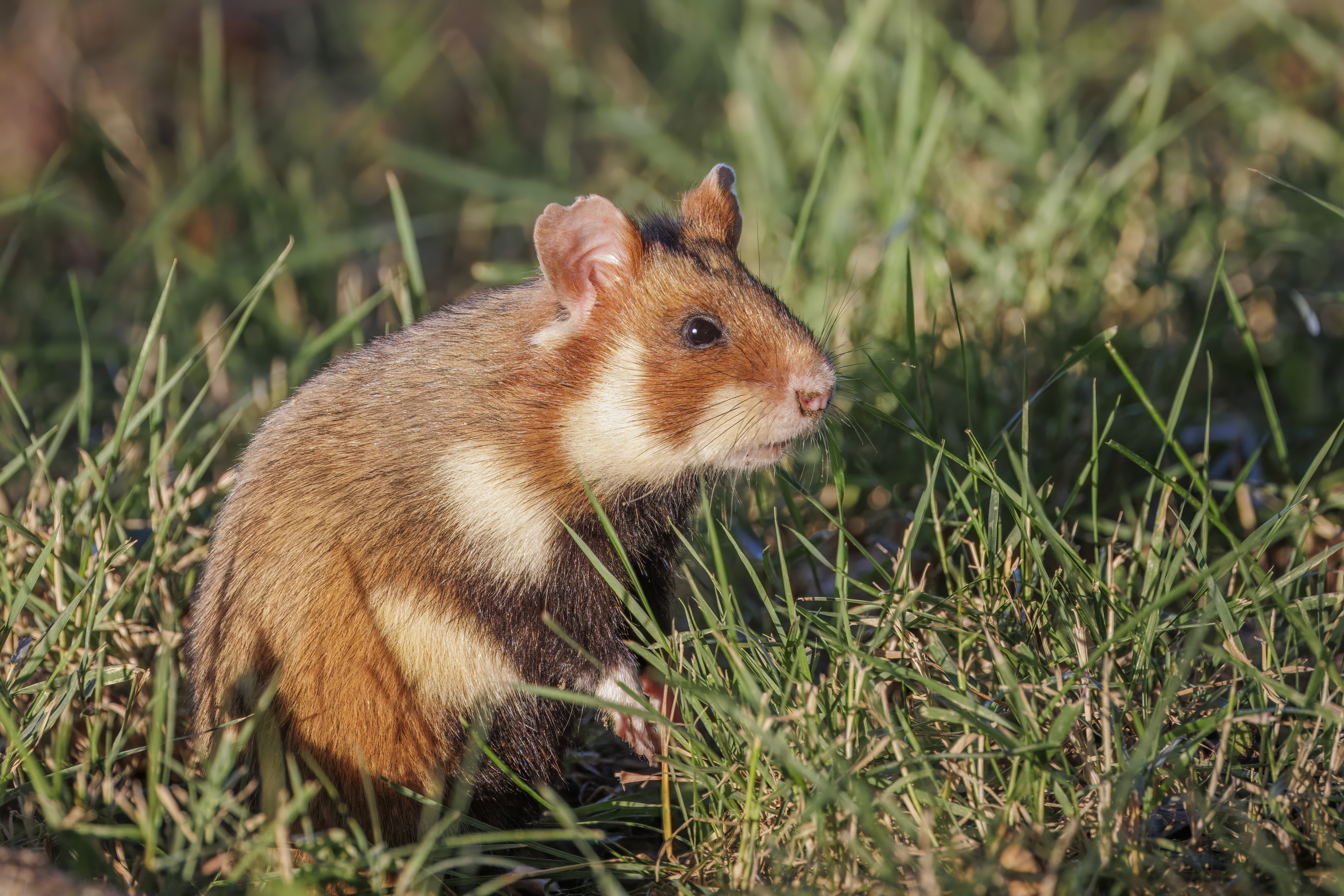
- Cricetus cricetus, the European hamster

Scientific classification
- Kingdom: Animalia
- Phylum: Chordata
- Class: Mammalia
- Order: Rodentia
- Family: Cricetidae
- Subfamily: Cricetinae; Fischer de Waldheim, 1817

Extant genera
- Allocricetulus; Cansumys; Cricetulus; Cricetus; Mesocricetus; Nothocricetulus; Phodopus; Tscherskia; Urocricetus; For extinct genera, see text

= Hamster =

Hamster Temporal range: Middle Miocene – present 15–0 Ma

Subfamily of rodents (Cricetinae)

Hamsters are rodents (order Rodentia) belonging to the subfamily Cricetinae, which contains 19 species classified in seven genera. They have become established as popular small pets. The best-known species of hamster is the golden or Syrian hamster (Mesocricetus auratus), which is the type most commonly kept as a pet. Other hamster species commonly kept as pets are the three species of dwarf hamster, Campbell's dwarf hamster (Phodopus campbelli), the winter white dwarf hamster (Phodopus sungorus, also commonly known as Djungarian hamster) and the Roborovski hamster (Phodopus roborovskii), and the less common Chinese hamster (Cricetulus griseus).

Hamsters feed primarily on seeds, fruits, vegetation, and occasionally burrowing insects. In the wild, they are crepuscular: they forage during the twilight hours. In captivity, however, they are known to live a conventionally nocturnal lifestyle, waking around sundown to feed and exercise. Physically, they are stout-bodied with distinguishing features that include elongated cheek pouches extending to their shoulders, which they use to carry food back to their burrows, as well as a short tail and fur-covered feet.

== Classification ==
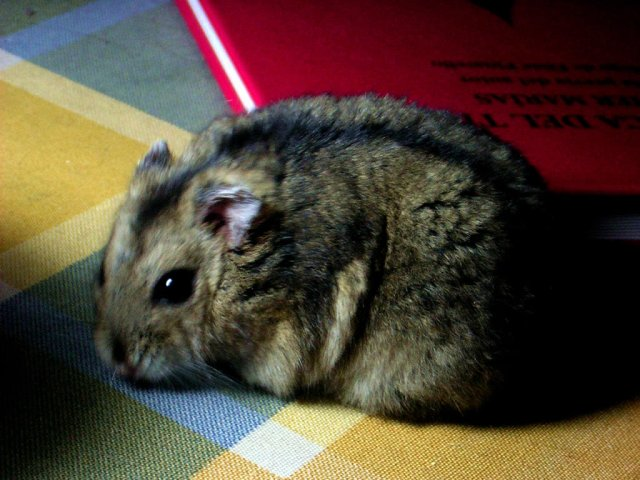
P. sungorus. The winter white dwarf hamster

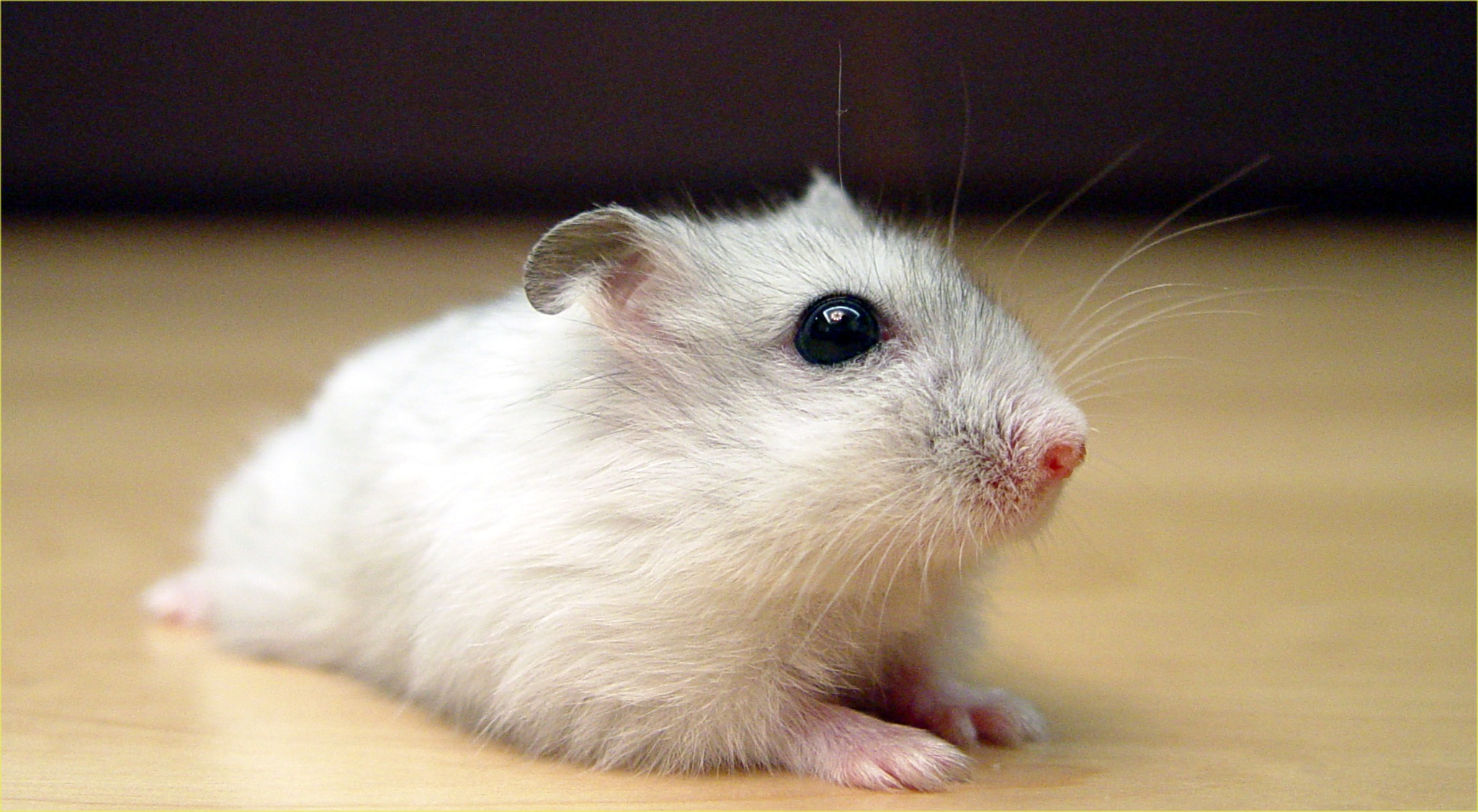
A winter white dwarf hamster

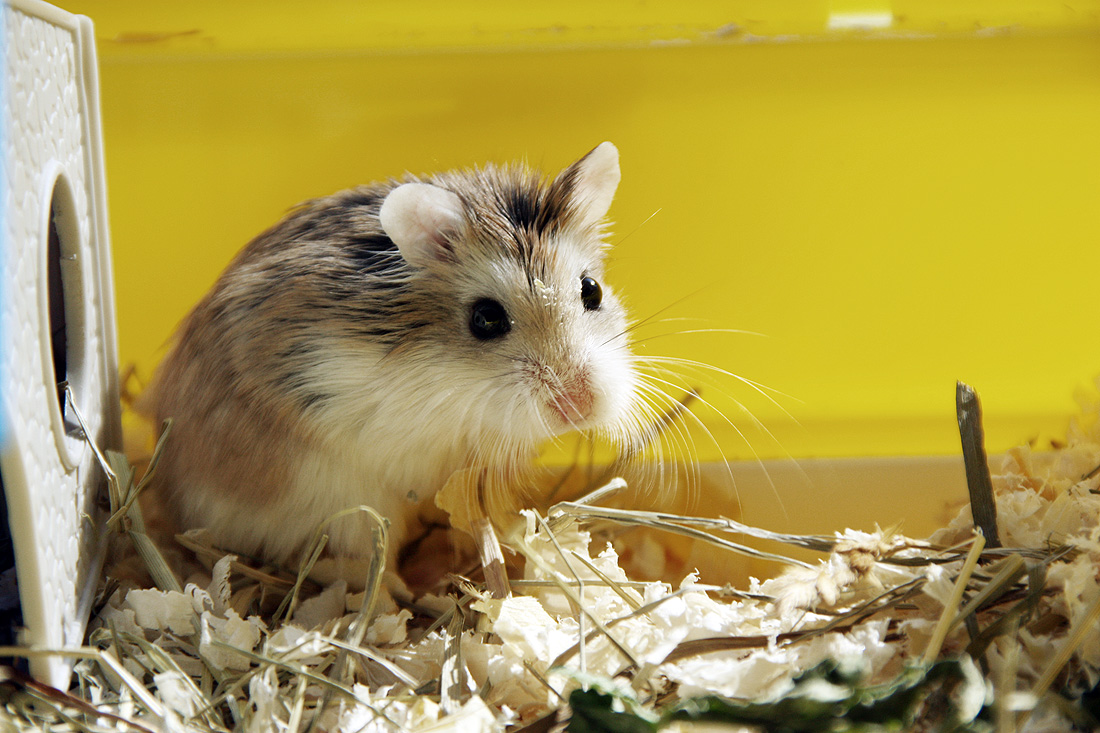
P. roborovski. The Roborovski hamster

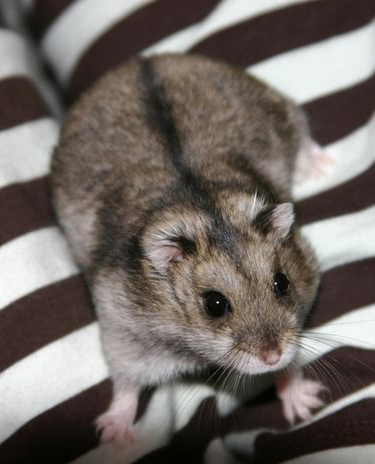
P. campbelli. The Campbell's dwarf hamster

The hamster subfamily Cricetinae forms part of the broader family Cricetidae, that also includes voles, lemmings and muskrats (all of which are in Arvicolinae), and New World rats and mice (Neotominae, Sigmodontinae and Tylomyinae). Within Cricetidae, Hamsters are most closely related to Arvicolinae. Cricetidae is placed as part of the broader clade Muroidea, within which Cricetidae is most closely related to Muridae, which includes Murinae (the Old World rats and mice), and gerbils (Gerbillinae) among others.

The earliest hamsters appeared during the Middle Miocene, around 15 million years ago, with the origin of the group likely being in central or eastern Europe, reaching eastern Asia by around 10 million years ago. A 2026 phylogenetic analysis found that the ancestor of all living hamsters probably only lived around 5-6 million years ago at the end of the Miocene, probably somewhere around southeast Europe or West Asia.

- Subfamily Cricetinae
  - Genus Allocricetulus
    - Species A. curtatus—Mongolian hamster
    - Species A. eversmanni—Eversmann's or Kazakh hamster
  - Genus Cansumys
    - Species C. canus—Gansu hamster
  - Genus Cricetulus
    - Species C. barabensis, including "C. pseudogriseus" and "C. obscurus"—Chinese striped hamster, also called Chinese hamster; striped dwarf hamster
    - Species C. griseus—Chinese (dwarf) hamster, also called rat hamster, sometimes considered a synonym of C. barabensis
    - Species C. longicaudatus—long-tailed dwarf hamster
    - Species C. sokolovi—Sokolov's dwarf hamster
  - Genus Cricetus
    - Species C. cricetus—European hamster, also called common hamster or black-bellied field hamster
  - Genus Mesocricetus—golden hamsters
    - Species M. auratus—golden or Syrian hamster
    - Species M. brandti—Turkish hamster, also called Brandt's hamster; Azerbaijani hamster
    - Species M. newtoni—Romanian hamster
    - Species M. raddei—Ciscaucasian hamster
  - Genus Nothocricetulus - grey dwarf hamster
    - Species N. migratorius—grey dwarf hamster, Armenian hamster, migratory grey hamster; grey hamster; migratory hamster
  - Genus Phodopus—dwarf hamsters
    - Species P. campbelli—Campbell's dwarf hamster
    - Species P. roborovskii—Roborovski hamster
    - Species P. sungorus—Djungarian hamster or winter-white Russian dwarf hamster
  - Genus Tscherskia
    - Species T. triton—greater long-tailed hamster, also called Korean hamster
  - Genus Urocricetus
    - Species U. alticola - Ladakh dwarf hamster
    - Species U. kamensis - Kam dwarf hamster

Cladogram of the relationships between the living genera, after Pan et al, 2025, with tribes after Dirnberger et al, 2026:

- Cricetinae
  - Urocricetini
    - Phodopus (Winter white, Roborovski, and Campbell's dwarf hamsters)
    - Urocricetus (Tibetan and Kam dwarf hamsters)
  - - Mesocricetini
      Mesocricetus (Golden, Turkish, Romanian and Ciscaucasian hamsters)
    - Cricetini
      - Cansumys (Gansu hamster)
      - - Tscherskia (Korean hamster)
        - - Cricetulus (Chinese striped hamster, long-tailed & Sokolov's dwarf hamsters)
          - - Nothocricetulus (Grey dwarf hamster)
            - - Allocricetulus (Mongolian & Eversmann's hamsters)
              - Cricetus (European hamster)

=== Fossil genera ===
After

- †Collimys
- †Rotundomys
- †Colloides
- †Nannocricetus
- †Cricetulodon (paraphyletic)
- †Neocricetodon
- †Stylocricetus
- †Pseudocricetus
- †Apocricetus
- †Tragomys
- †Hattomys
- †Hypsocricetus
- †Moldavimus
- †Sinocricetus

== Etymology ==
The name "hamster" is a loanword from the German, which itself derives from earlier Middle High German hamastra. It is possibly related to Old Church Slavonic khomestoru, which is either a blend of the root of Russian хомяк (khomyak) "hamster" and a Baltic word (cf. Lithuanian: staras "hamster"); or of Persian origin (cf. Avestan: hamaēstar "oppressor"). The collective noun for a group of hamsters is "horde". In German, the verb hamstern is derived from Hamster. It means "to hoard".

== Description ==
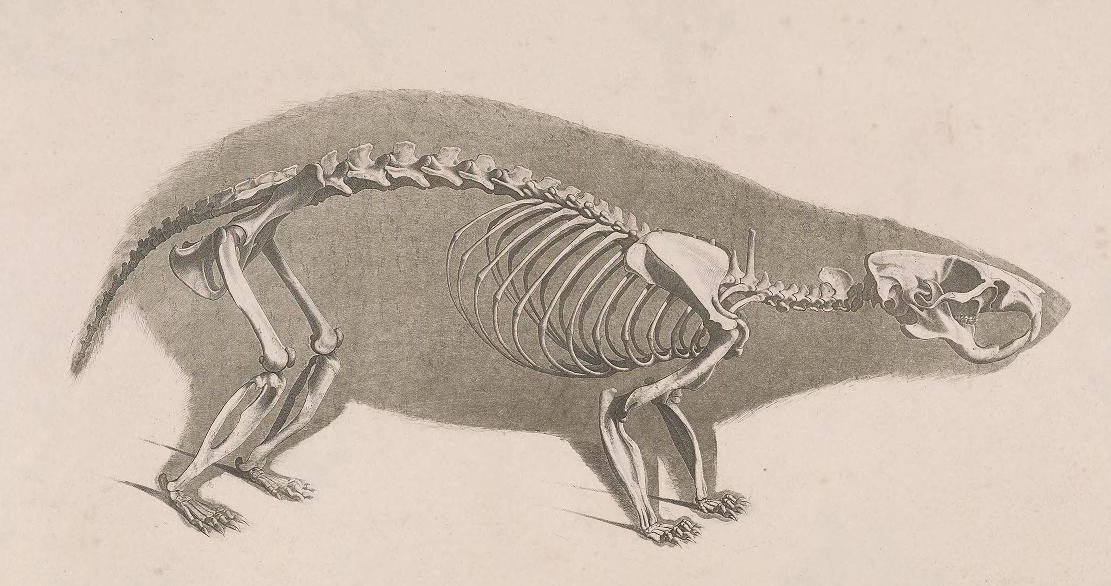
Skeleton of European hamster

Hamsters are typically stout-bodied, with tails shorter than body length, and have small, furry ears, short, stocky legs, and wide feet. They have thick, silky fur, which can be long or short, colored black, grey, honey, white, brown, yellow, red, or a mix, depending on the species. Two species of hamster belonging to the genus Phodopus, Campbell's dwarf hamster (P. campbelli) and the Djungarian hamster (P. sungorus), and two of the genus Cricetulus, the Chinese striped hamster (C. barabensis) and the Chinese hamster (C. griseus) have a dark stripe down their heads to their tails. The species of genus Phodopus are the smallest, with bodies 5.5 to 10.5 cm (2.2 to 4.1 in) long; the largest is the European hamster (Cricetus cricetus), measuring up to 34 cm (13 in) long, not including a short tail of up to 6 cm (2.4 in).

The hamster tail can be difficult to see, as it is usually not very long (about 1/6 the length of the body), with the exception of the Chinese hamster, which has a tail the same length as the body. One rodent characteristic that can be highly visible in hamsters is their sharp incisors; they have an upper pair and lower pair which grow continuously throughout life, so must be regularly worn down. Hamsters are very flexible, but their bones are somewhat fragile. They are extremely susceptible to rapid temperature changes and drafts, as well as extreme heat or cold.

=== Senses ===
Hamsters have poor eyesight; they are nearsighted and colorblind. Their eyesight leads to them not having a good sense of distance or knowing where they are, but that does not stop them from climbing in (and sometimes out of) their cages or from being adventurous. Hamsters can sense movement around at all times, which helps protect them from harm in the wild. In a household, this sense helps them know when their owner is near. Hamsters have scent glands on their flanks (and abdomens in Chinese and dwarf hamsters) which they rub against the surface beneath them, leaving a scent trail. Hamsters also use their sense of smell to distinguish between the sexes and to locate food. Mother hamsters can also use their sense of smell to find their own babies and identify which ones are not theirs. Their scent glands can also be used to mark their territories, their babies, or their mate. Hamsters catch sounds by having their ears upright. They tend to learn similar noises and begin to know the sound of their food and even their owner's voice. They are also particularly sensitive to high-pitched noises and can hear and communicate in the ultrasonic range.

=== Diet ===
Hamsters are omnivores, which means they can eat meat and plant matter. Hamsters that live in the wild eat seeds, grass, and even insects. Although pet hamsters can survive on a diet of exclusively commercial hamster food, other items, such as vegetables, fruits, seeds, and nuts, can be given. Although store-bought food is good for hamsters, it is best if fruits and vegetables are also in their diet because it keeps them healthier. Hamsters in the Middle East have been known to hunt in packs to find insects for food. Hamsters are hindgut fermenters and often eat their own feces (coprophagy) to recover nutrients digested in the hind-gut, but not absorbed.

== Behavior ==
=== Feeding ===
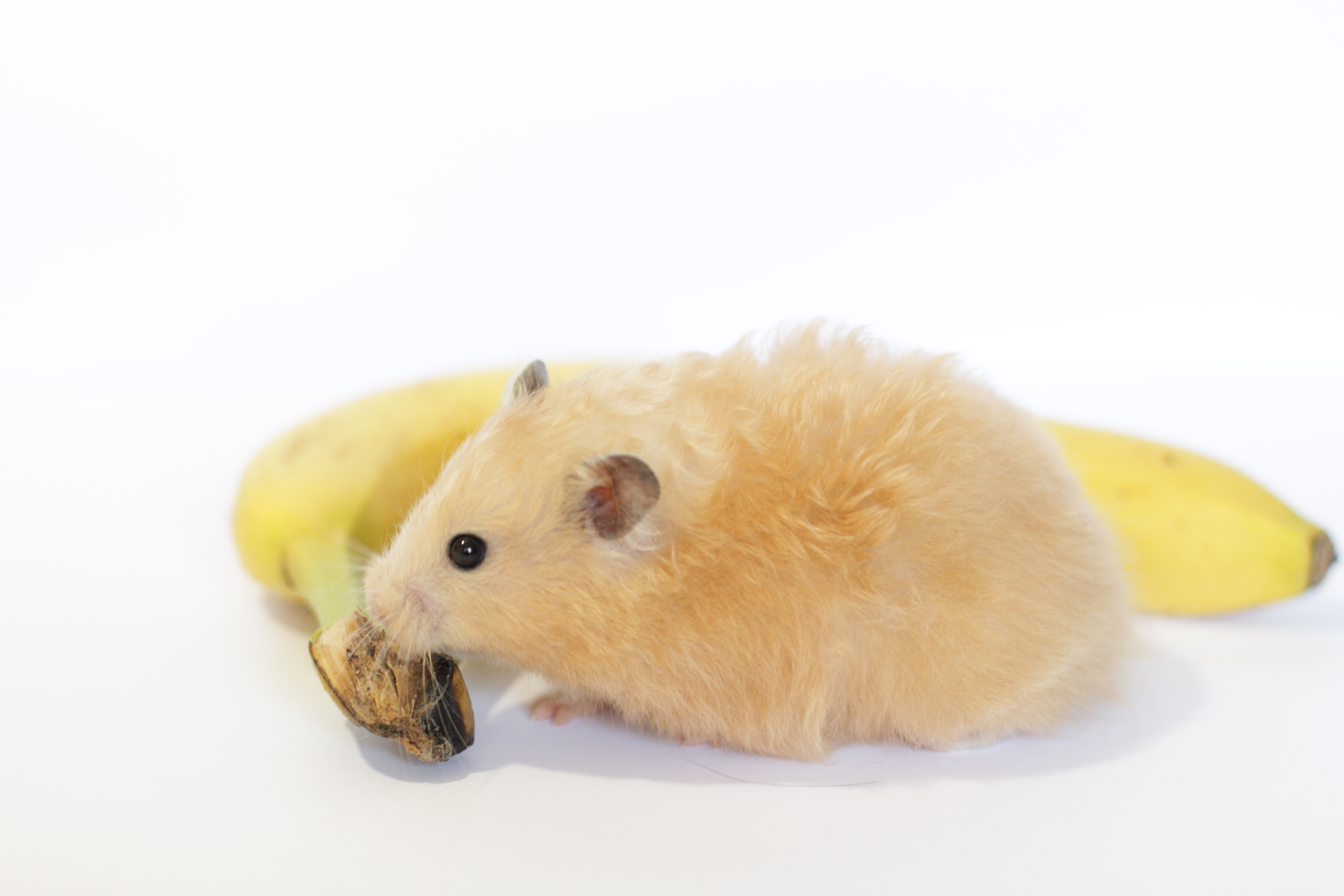
Pet Syrian hamster examines a banana

A behavioral characteristic of hamsters is food hoarding. They carry food in their spacious cheek pouches to their underground storage chambers. When full, the cheeks can make their heads double, or even triple in size. Hamsters lose weight during the autumn months in anticipation of winter. This occurs even when hamsters are kept as pets and is related to an increase in exercise.

=== Social behavior ===
Most hamsters are strictly solitary. If housed together, acute and chronic stress might occur, and they might fight fiercely, sometimes fatally. Dwarf hamster species might tolerate siblings or same-gender unrelated hamsters if introduced at an early enough age, but this cannot be guaranteed. Hamsters communicate through body language to one another and even to their owner. They communicate by sending a specific scent using their scent glands and also show body language to express how they are feeling.

=== Chronobiology ===
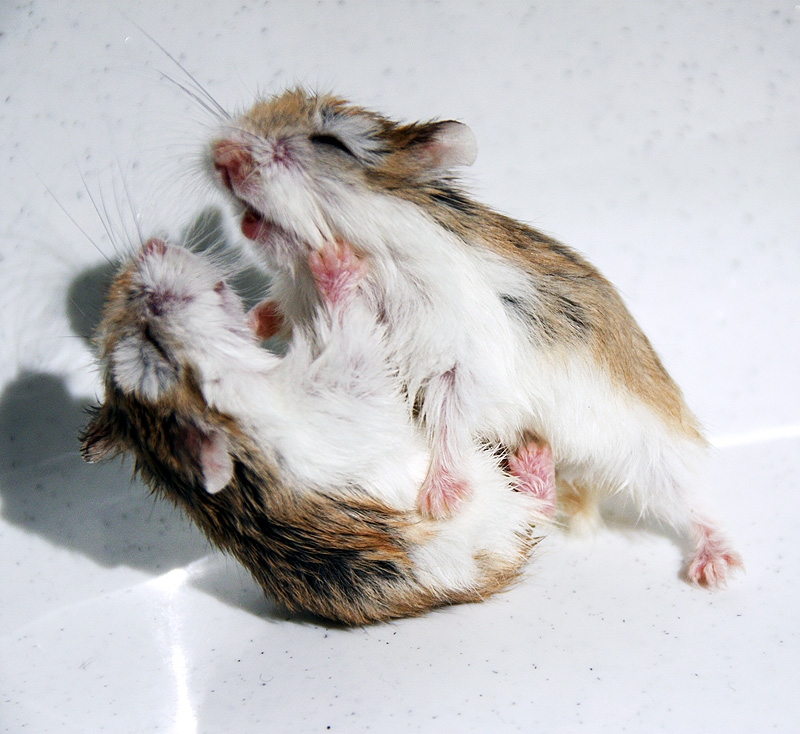
Hamsters fighting

Hamsters can be described as nocturnal or crepuscular (active mostly at dawn and dusk). Khunen writes, "Hamsters are nocturnal rodents who are active during the night", but others have written that because hamsters live underground during most of the day, only leaving their burrows for about an hour before sundown and then returning when it gets dark, their behavior is primarily crepuscular. Fritzsche indicated although some species have been observed to show more nocturnal activity than others, they are all primarily crepuscular.

In the wild Syrian hamsters can hibernate and allow their body temperature to fall close to ambient temperature. This kind of thermoregulation diminishes the metabolic rate to about 5% and helps the animal to considerably reduce the need for food during the winter. Hibernation can last up to one week but more commonly lasts 2–3 days. When kept as house pets the Syrian hamster does not hibernate.

=== Burrowing behavior ===
All hamsters are excellent diggers, constructing burrows with one or more entrances, with galleries connected to chambers for nesting, food storage, and other activities. They use their fore- and hindlegs, as well as their snouts and teeth, for digging. In the wild, the burrow buffers extreme ambient temperatures, offers relatively stable climatic conditions, and protects against predators. Syrian hamsters dig their burrows generally at a depth of 70 cm (2.3 ft). A burrow includes a steep entrance pipe (4–5 cm (1.6–2.0 in) in diameter), a nesting and a hoarding chamber and a blind-ending branch for urination. Laboratory hamsters have not lost their ability to dig burrows; in fact, they will do this with great vigor and skill if they are provided with the appropriate substrate.

Wild hamsters will also appropriate tunnels made by other mammals; the Djungarian hamster, for instance, uses paths and burrows of the pika.

== Reproduction ==
=== Fertility ===
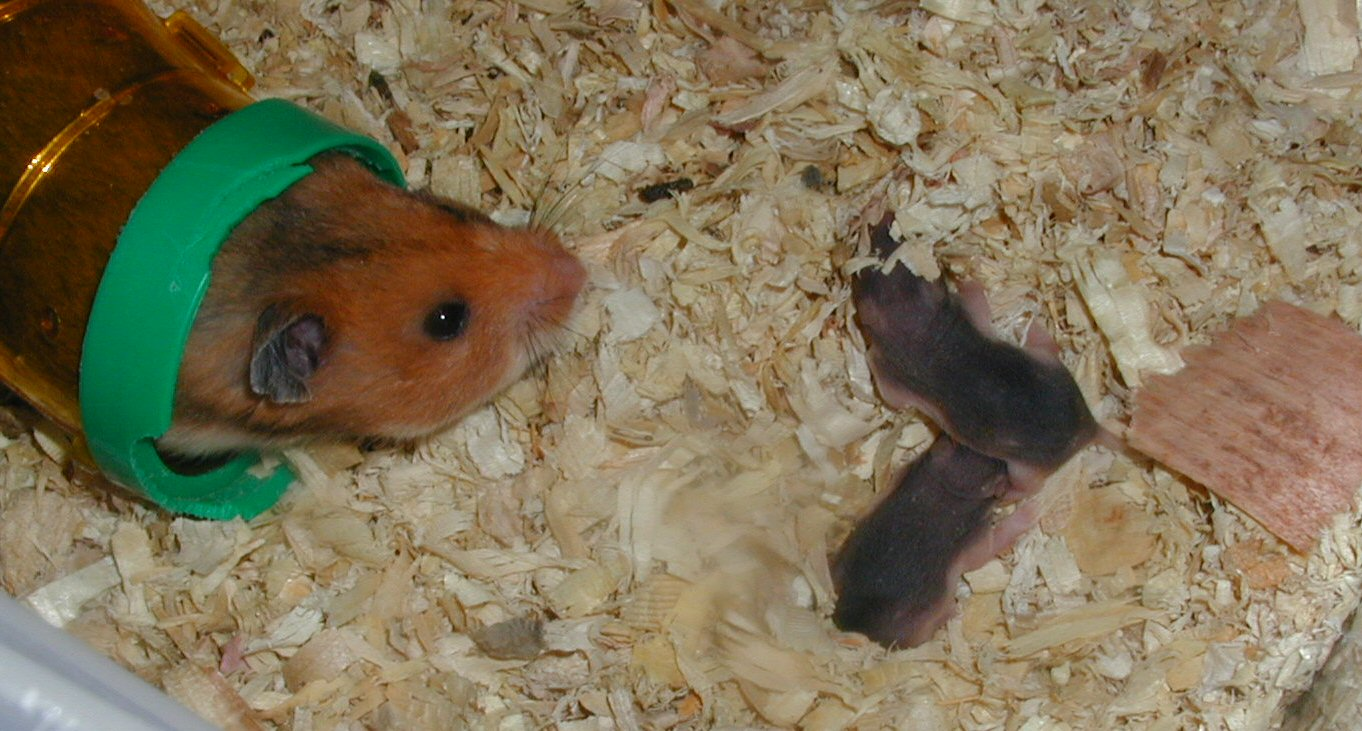
A mother Syrian hamster with pups less than one week old

Hamsters become fertile at different ages depending on their species. Both Syrian and Russian hamsters mature quickly and can begin reproducing at a young age (4–5 weeks), whereas Chinese hamsters will usually begin reproducing at two to three months of age, and Roborovskis at three to four months of age. The female's reproductive life lasts about 18 months, but male hamsters remain fertile much longer. Females are in estrus about every four days, which is indicated by a reddening of genital areas, a musky smell, and a hissing, squeaking vocalisation she will emit if she believes a male is nearby.

When seen from above, a sexually mature female hamster has a trim tail line; a male's tail line bulges on both sides. This might not be very visible in all species. Male hamsters typically have very large testes in relation to their body size. Before sexual maturity occurs, it is more difficult to determine a young hamster's sex. When examined, female hamsters have their anal and genital openings close together, whereas males have these two holes farther apart (the penis is usually withdrawn into the coat and thus appears as a hole or pink pimple).

=== Gestation and fecundity ===
Syrian hamsters are seasonal breeders and will produce several litters a year with several pups in each litter. The breeding season is from April to October in the Northern Hemisphere, with two to five litters of one to 13 young being born after a gestation period of 16 to 23 days. Dwarf hamsters breed all through the year. Gestation lasts 16 to 18 days for Syrian hamsters, 18 to 21 days for Russian hamsters, 21 to 23 days for Chinese hamsters and 23 to 30 for Roborovski hamsters. The average litter size for Syrian hamsters is about seven pups, but can be as great as 24, which is the maximum number of pups that can be contained in the uterus. Campbell's dwarf hamsters tend to have four to eight pups in a litter, but can have up to 13. Winter white hamsters tend to have slightly smaller litters, as do Chinese and Roborovski hamsters.

=== Intersexual aggression and cannibalism ===
Female Chinese and Syrian hamsters are known for being aggressive toward males if kept together for too long after mating. In some cases, male hamsters can die after being attacked by a female. If breeding hamsters, separation of the pair after mating is recommended, or they will attack each other.

Female hamsters are also particularly sensitive to disturbances while giving birth, and may even eat their own young if they think they are in danger, although sometimes they are just carrying the pups in their cheek pouches. If captive female hamsters are left for extended periods (three weeks or more) with their litter, they may cannibalize the litter, so the litter must be removed by the time the young can feed and drink independently.

=== Weaning ===
An adult female and several juvenile dwarf hamsters (Phodopus sungorus) feeding

Hamsters are born hairless and blind in a nest the mother will have prepared in advance. After one week, they begin to explore outside the nest. Hamsters are capable of producing litters every month. Hamsters can be bred after they are three weeks old. It may be hard for the babies to not rely on their mother for nursing during this time, so it is important that they are supplied with food to make the transition from nursing to eating on their own easier. After the hamsters reach three weeks of age they are considered mature.

=== Longevity ===
Syrian hamsters typically live no more than two to three years in captivity, and less in the wild. Russian hamsters (Campbell's and Djungarian) live about two to four years in captivity, and Chinese hamsters 2 1/2–3 years. The smaller Roborovski hamster often lives to three years in captivity.

== Society and culture ==
=== History ===
Although the Syrian hamster or golden hamster (Mesocricetus auratus) was first described scientifically by George Robert Waterhouse in 1839, researchers were not able to successfully breed and domesticate hamsters until 1939. The entire laboratory and pet populations of Syrian hamsters appear to be descendants of a single brother–sister pairing. These littermates were captured and imported in 1930 from Aleppo in Syria by Israel Aharoni, a zoologist of the University of Jerusalem. In Jerusalem, the hamsters bred very successfully. Years later, animals of this original breeding colony were exported to the United States, where Syrian hamsters became a common pet and laboratory animal. Comparative studies of domestic and wild Syrian hamsters have shown reduced genetic variability in the domestic strain. However, the differences in behavioral, chronobiological, morphometrical, hematological, and biochemical parameters are relatively small and fall into the expected range of interstrain variations in other laboratory animals.

=== Hamsters as pets ===
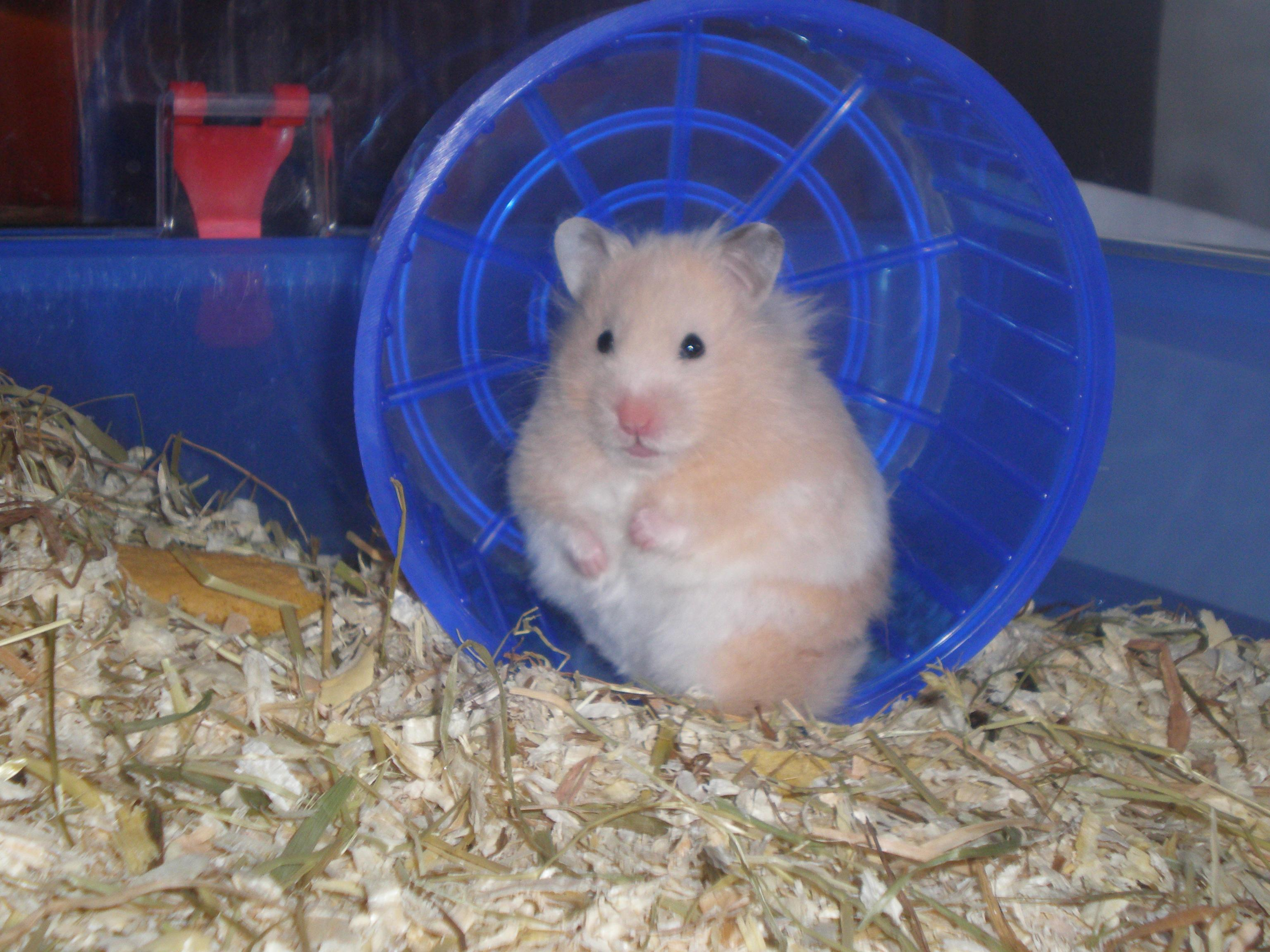
A Syrian hamster (Mesocricetus auratus) standing in exercise wheel

The best-known species of hamster is the golden or Syrian hamster (Mesocricetus auratus), which is the type most commonly kept as pets. There are numerous Syrian hamster variations including long-haired varieties and different colors. British zoologist Leonard Goodwin claimed most hamsters kept in the United Kingdom were descended from the colony he introduced for medical research purposes during the Second World War. Hamsters were domesticated and kept as pets in the United States at least as early as 1942.

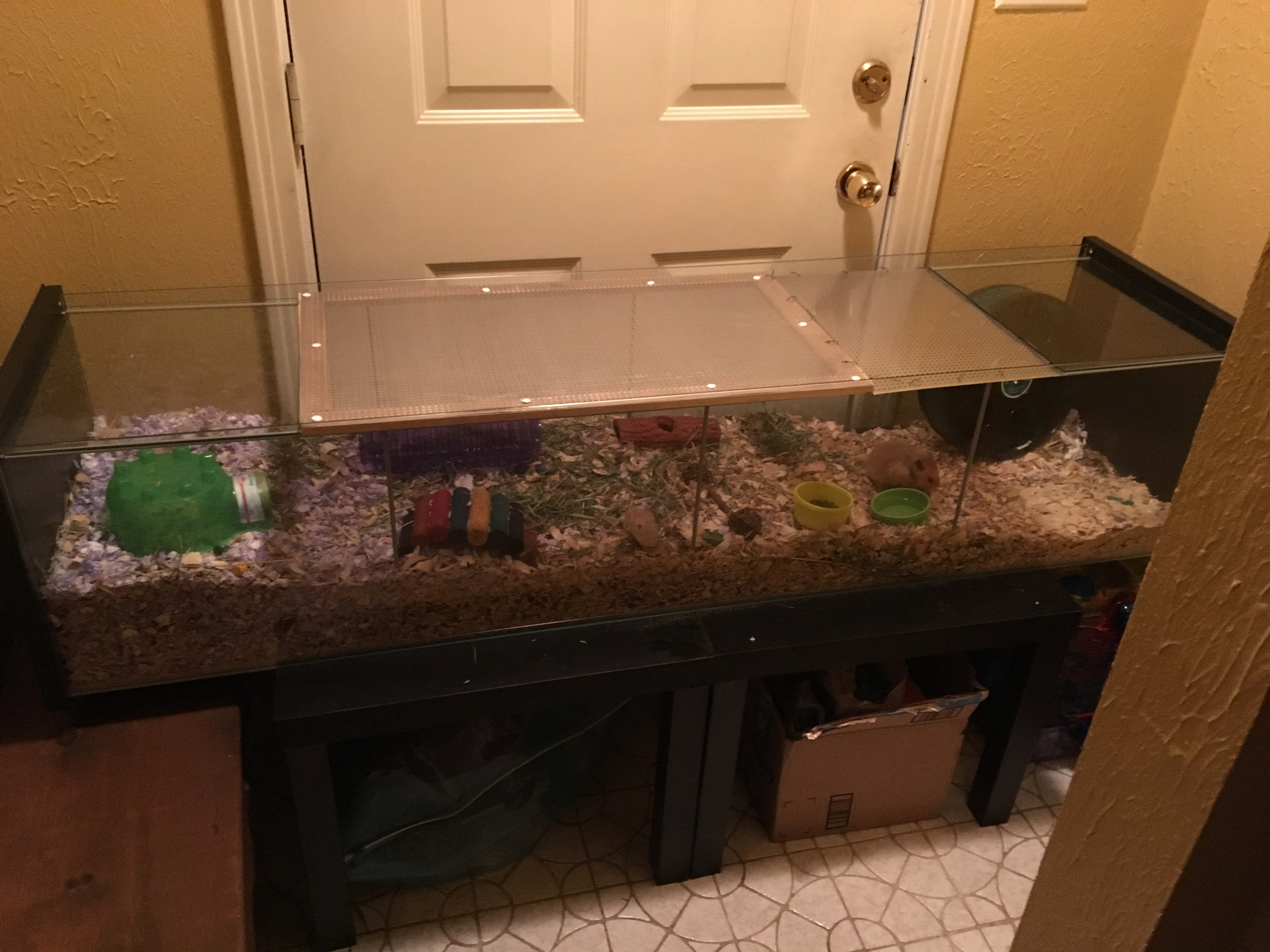
A spacious hamster cage made from a display cabinet

Other hamsters commonly kept as pets are the three species in the genus Phodopus. Campbell's dwarf hamster (Phodopus campbelli) is the most common—they are also sometimes called "Russian dwarfs"; however, many hamsters are from Russia, so this ambiguous name does not distinguish them from other species appropriately. The coat of the winter white dwarf hamster (Phodopus sungorus) turns almost white during winter (when the hours of daylight decrease). The Roborovski hamster (Phodopus roborovskii) is extremely small and fast, making it difficult to keep as a pet.

=== Hamster shows ===
A hamster show is an event in which people gather hamsters to judge them against each other. Hamster shows are also places where people share their enthusiasm for hamsters among attendees. Hamster shows feature an exhibition of the hamsters participating in the judging.

The judging of hamsters usually includes a goal of promoting hamsters which conform to natural or established varieties of hamsters. By awarding hamsters which match standard hamster types, hamster shows encourage planned and careful hamster breeding.

=== Owner activism ===
When the first reported case of animal-to-human transmission of SARS-CoV-2 in Hong Kong took place via imported pet hamsters, researchers expressed difficulty in identifying some of the viral mutations within a global genomic data bank, leading city authorities to announce a mass cull of all hamsters purchased after 22 December 2021, which would affect roughly 2,000 animals. After the government 'strongly encouraged' citizens to turn in their pets, approximately 3,000 people joined underground activities to promote the adoption of abandoned hamsters throughout the city and to maintain pet ownership via methods such as the forgery of pet store purchase receipts. Some activists attempted to intercept owners who were on their way to turn in pet hamsters and encourage them to choose adoption instead, which the government subsequently warned would be subject to police action.

=== Hamsters as lab animals ===
The extracted cells of babies' kidneys and adults' ovaries are used to study cholesterol synthesis.

== Similar animals ==
Some similar rodents sometimes called "hamsters" are not currently classified in the hamster subfamily Cricetinae. These include the maned hamster, or crested hamster, which is really the maned rat (Lophiomys imhausi). Others are the mouse-like hamsters (Calomyscus spp.), and the white-tailed rat (Mystromys albicaudatus).

== See also ==
- Chinchilla
- Ebichu
- Gerbil
- Guinea pig
- Hampster Dance
- Hamster ball
- Hamster cage
- Hamster racing
- Hamster show
- Hamster wheel
- Hamtaro
- Rat
- Wet-tail
