= Gansu hamster =

Conservation status
- Least Concern (IUCN 3.1)

Scientific classification
- Kingdom: Animalia
- Phylum: Chordata
- Class: Mammalia
- Order: Rodentia
- Family: Cricetidae
- Subfamily: Cricetinae
- Genus: Cansumys; G. M. Allen, 1928
- Species: C. canus

Binomial name
- Cansumys canus G. M. Allen, 1928

Species of rodent

The Gansu hamster (Cansumys canus) is a species of rodent in the family Cricetidae, endemic to China. It is the only species in the genus Cansumys.
