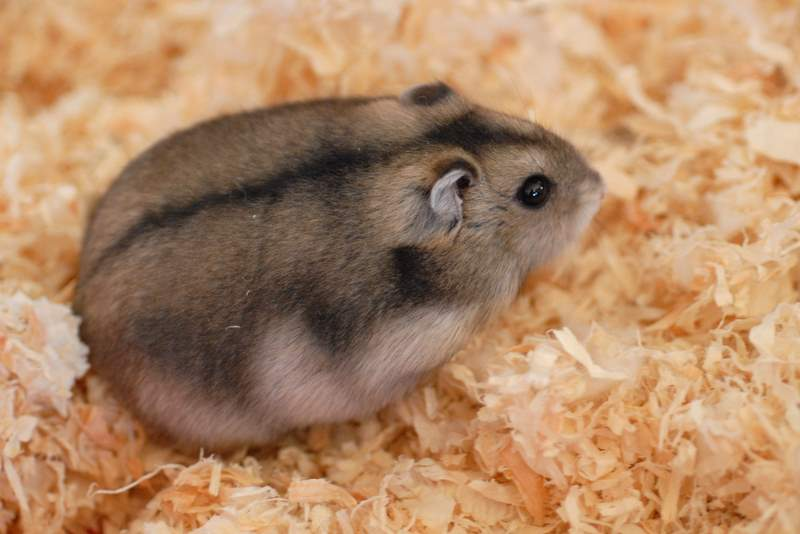

Conservation status
- Least Concern (IUCN 3.1)

Scientific classification
- Kingdom: Animalia
- Phylum: Chordata
- Class: Mammalia
- Order: Rodentia
- Family: Cricetidae
- Subfamily: Cricetinae
- Genus: Phodopus
- Species: P. sungorus

Binomial name
- Phodopus sungorus (Pallas, 1773)
- Range of P. sungorus Resident

= Winter white dwarf hamster =

Species of hamster

The winter white dwarf hamster (Phodopus sungorus), also known as the Russian dwarf hamster, Djungarian hamster, Dzungarian hamster, striped dwarf hamster, Siberian hamster, or Siberian dwarf hamster, is one of three species of hamster in the genus Phodopus. Its body is ball-shaped and typically half the size of the golden hamster, so is called a dwarf hamster along with all Phodopus species. Features of the winter white hamster include a typically thick, dark grey dorsal stripe and furry feet. As winter approaches and the days shorten, the winter white dwarf hamster's dark fur is almost entirely replaced with white fur. In captivity, this does not usually happen as animals maintained as pets are generally housed indoors and exposed to artificial light that prevents the recognition of short winter daylengths. In the wild, they originate from the wheat fields of Kazakhstan, the meadows of Mongolia and Siberia, and the birch stands of Manchuria.

Winter white dwarf hamsters are common pets in Europe and North America, and exhibit greater variance in their coats than those found in the wild. They reproduce often—more so than golden hamsters, and as they have no fixed breeding season, can continue to produce some numbers of offspring all year round. Breeding females may show aggression to males. The winter white is known to be one of the most tamable types of hamsters.

One of the more complex questions is how keeping Siberian hamsters together affects their welfare. While hamsters of the same sex can be kept together under certain conditions, in other cases co-housing may cause stress and aggression between hamsters, and may even pose a risk to their lives. Specifically, hamsters from the same litter, or those that have been raised together from a young age, are more likely to get along. However, hamsters may begin fighting later in life, even if they initially got along well. Such fighting is not play and can endanger their lives. In addition, the risk of aggression also depends on housing conditions, particularly the size of the enclosure and the availability of sufficient resources: water and food bowls, an exercise wheel, enrichment items, and hiding places should be provided in quantities appropriate for the number of hamsters in order to reduce the risk of fighting.

In the context of keeping a hamster alone in an enclosure, various sources also emphasize the importance of the quality of enrichment for hamster welfare and health, particularly a large enclosure, a large exercise wheel, and deep bedding made of a suitable material. They also raise concerns that standard enclosures and exercise wheels may not meet these requirements.

== Naming ==
The hamster has no fully accepted common name, but winter white dwarf hamster and Russian dwarf hamster are among the most often used. Confusion arises because of their physical similarity to Campbell's dwarf hamster; consequently, the name Djungarian hamster and Russian dwarf can refer to both winter white and Campbell's dwarf hamsters. The term "winter white" derives from the fact that in the wild the hamster changes its fur colour to white for the winter months. This camouflages the hamster and reduces predation when snow is on the ground. Campbell's dwarf hamsters do not change fur colour during the winter and can only be described as being "winter white" erroneously.

The binomial name for the hamster is Phodopus sungorus. The hamster was first described by Peter Simon Pallas in 1773 as a mouse. The name sungorus derives from the geographic region Dzungaria. In 1778, Pallas renamed the hamster to Mouse songarus. In 1912 Ned Hollister ordered the "Mouse songarus" to the genus Phodopus. A. I. Argiropulo, in 1933, changed the name to priority sungorus and determined the hamster as a subspecies of Campbell's dwarf hamster called Phodopus sungorus sungorus. Today winter white dwarf hamsters and Campbell's dwarf hamsters are considered separate species, with the winter white officially known as Phodopus sungorus.

== Physical description ==
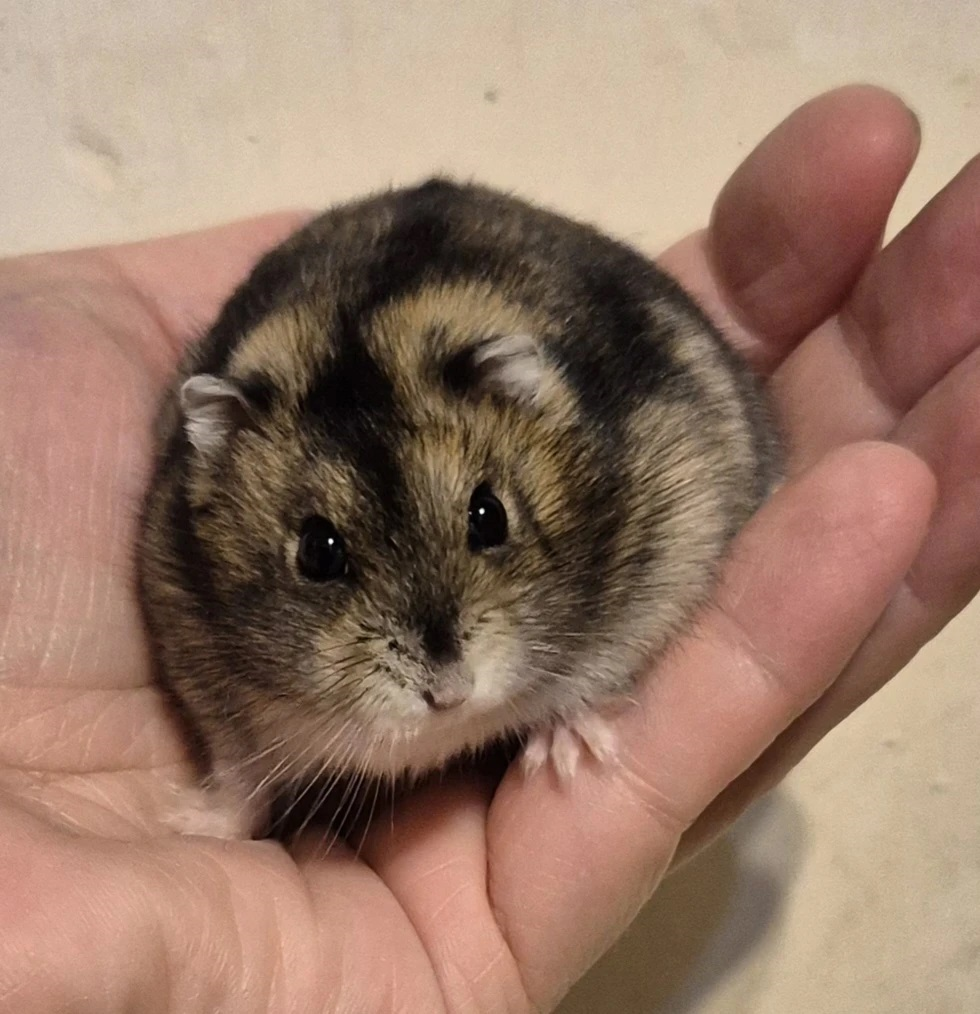
Agouti colouration (natural color)

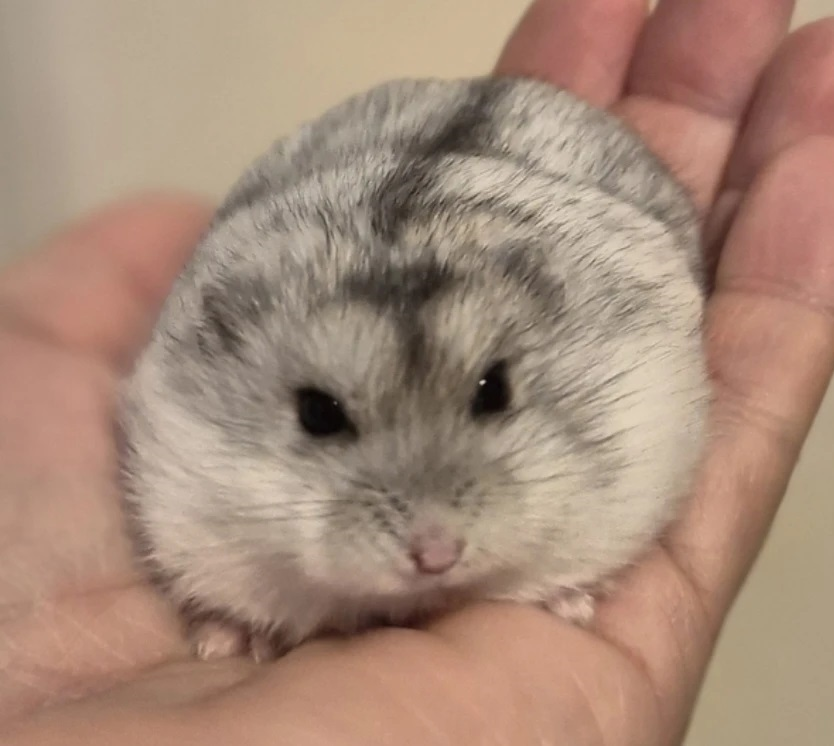
Pearl colouration

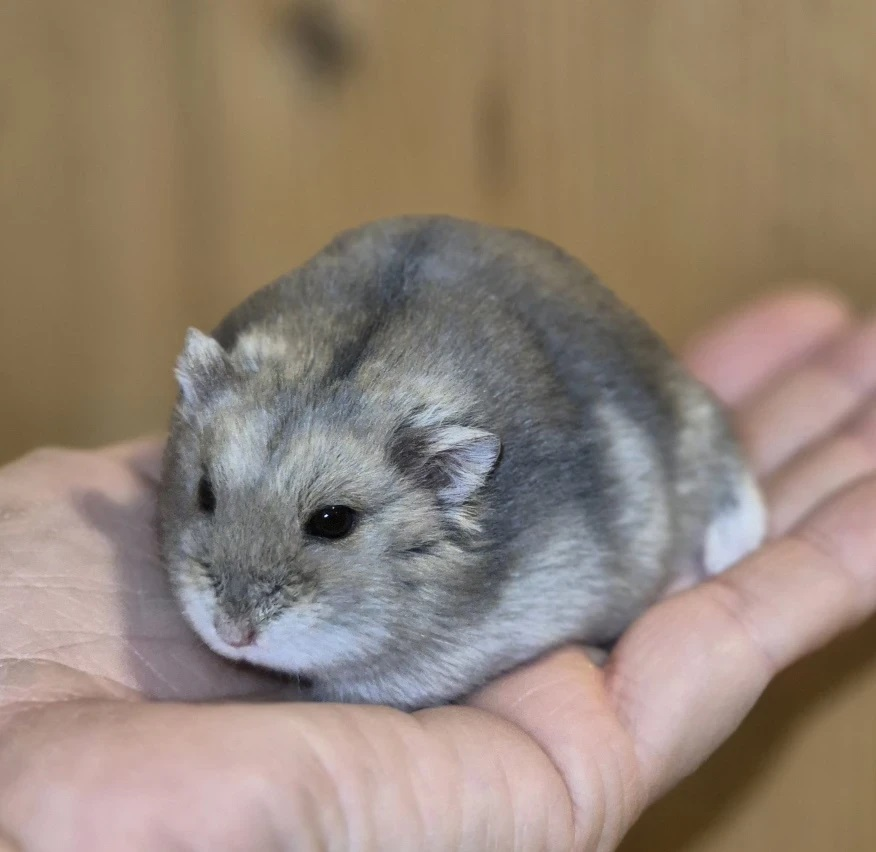
Sapphire colouration

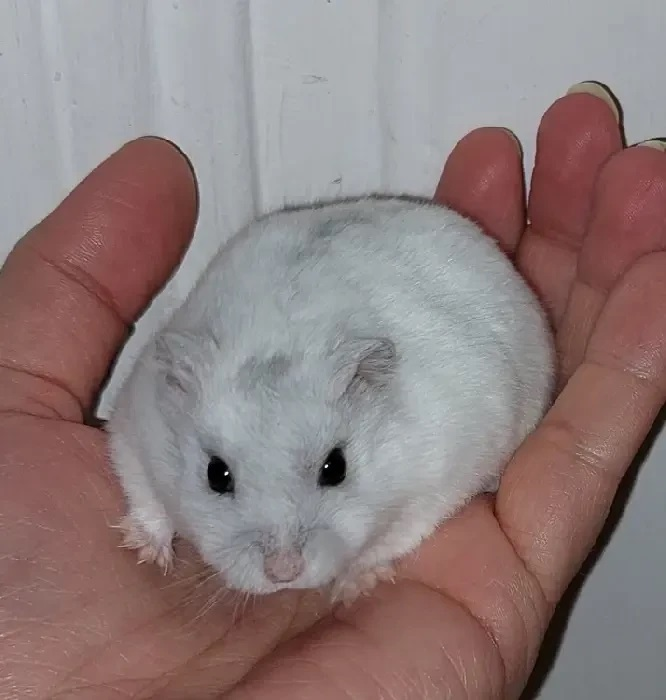
Pearl sapphire colouration

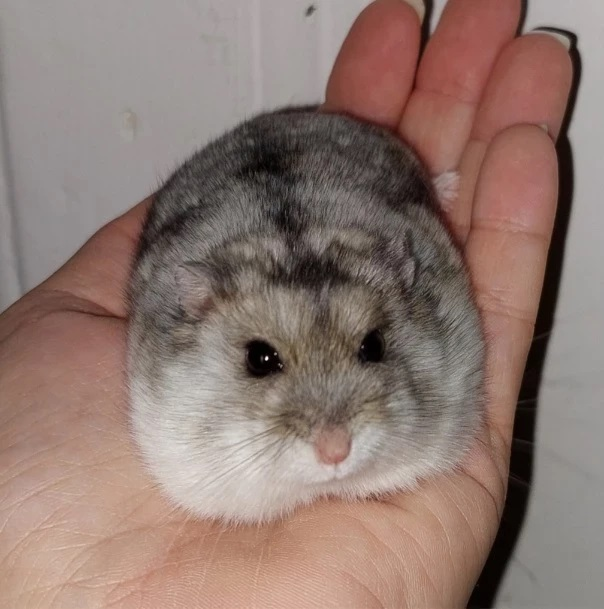
Merle colouration

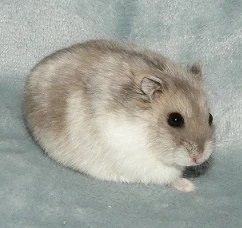
Merle sapphire colouration

The coat of the winter white dwarf hamster is less woolly than that of Campbell's dwarf hamster, and apart from the normal colouring, they can be coloured sapphire, sapphire pearl, or normal pearl. The head and body length of the winter white dwarf hamster is 70–90 mm, the length of the tail is 5–15 mm (0.20–0.59 in), and the hind legs are 11–15 mm (0.43–0.59 in). The body weight changes dramatically throughout the year. It is at its lowest during the winter. In males, the body weight ranges from 19 to 45 grams (0.67 to 1.59 oz), and in females, 19 to 36 grams (0.67 to 1.27 oz). In human care, they are slightly heavier. The average lifespan of the winter white dwarf hamster is one to three years in captivity, though they can live longer. In the wild, they are known to live as little as one year.

In summer, the fur of the winter white hamster on the back changes from ash-grey to dark brown, or sometimes pale brown with a tint. The face changes to grey or brown, while the mouth area, the whisker area, and the ears are slightly brighter. The outer ears and the eyes have black edges. The rest of the head is dark brown or black. From the head to the tail runs a black-brown dorsal stripe. The throat, belly, tail and limbs are white. The ears are grey with a pinkish tint with scattered black hairs. The hairs on the underside are completely white. The bright coat the bottom extends to the shoulders, flanks, and hips in three arches upward. It is distinguished from the darker fur on the top of the existing black-brown hair, three curved line.

Apart from the typical colouration, winter white dwarf hamsters can also be coloured pearl, sapphire, sapphire pearl, and marbled. Other colorations are available, but these are strongly suspected to appear only in hybrid crossings with Campbell's dwarf hamsters. Some of these colorations are mandarin, blue, argente, yellow blue fawn, camel, brown, cream, merle, and umbrous.

In the winter, the fur is more dense. They sometimes have a grey tint on their heads. More than 10% of the hamsters kept in the first winter develop the summer coat. In the second winter, only a few change into the winter coat and winter colour is less pronounced. The moulting in the winter fur starts in October or November and is completed in December, while the summer coat begins in January or February and is completed in March or early April. The ears are grey with a pinkish tint.

Moulting both run jobs on the head and the back of the spine to the sides, the legs and the underside. The hairs grow longer in the summer, to about ten millimetres long.

The pigmentation of hair is controlled by the hormone prolactin and colour genetics. Day length can be less than 14 hours to initiate the change to winter coat, though it is possible they may be able to sense a directional change in photoperiod length, such as in one experiment that demonstrated a transition from 16 hours of light to 14 hours initiates a change to the winter coat. The change to the winter coat can be triggered in the summer by the short day lengths. The change occurs back to the summer coat in the autumn, when the length of the days change again. At internal temperatures hamsters in captivity start later with the changes. The winter colour is less pronounced in them. The eyes of the winter white hamster are black, unless it is albino, in which case they are red.

== In the wild ==
In the wild, the hamster's fur changes colour in the winter. This adaptation helps them to evade predators in the snow-covered steppes. The hamster digs tunnels one metre deep leading to ground burrows where they can sleep, raise their young and hide from predators. The weasel is one of the hamster's main predators. Most of these burrows have six entrances. In the summer, the burrows are lined with moss. To keep the burrow warm in the winter, the hamster closes all but one entrance and lines the burrows with animal fur or wool that it finds. The temperature inside the burrow is usually 16.7 °C (62.1 °F). The hamsters sometimes live in the semideserts in Central Asia. They also live in the dry steppes and wheat or alfalfa fields, as well as on small fields in the forests of the region around Minusinsk. The fur on the hamster's feet protect the feet from the cold ground in the cold climates in the wild. The population density is highly varied. In 1968, the first four examples of the hamster were caught in Western Siberia and brought to the Max Planck Institute in Germany.

== Pet ownership ==
Winter white hamsters are often found on the pet market in Europe, Japan, and North America. Care of this hamster is similar to all other species of Phodopus.

== Breeding ==
Winter white dwarf hamsters reproduce at a faster rate than golden hamsters. Research suggests biparental care in Campbell's hamsters (P. campbelli) but not in winter white hamsters (P. sungorus). Frequent fighting can occur between the pups and as soon as they are weaned from their mother, they are separated from her. Most of the dwarf hamsters grow to 3 to 4″ long. Hamsters maintained indoors that get artificial illumination during autumn and winter are likely to breed all year round, whereas in the wild and in animals maintained in captivity but under entirely natural light-dark cycles, breeding is restricted to the long days of spring and summer.

During the breeding time, the hamster may become aggressive. After mating, the female may want to attack the male to protect her babies. The male usually hides in holes or caves to escape the vicious bite of the female. The hamster's estrous cycle lasts four days; every four days, the female may accept the male back to breed again. This usually occurs when the darkness of the evening sets in. If male and female hamsters are not housed together from a young age, determining if the female is willing to breed with the male is difficult.

=== Hybrids ===
Of the five species of hamsters kept commonly as pets, only the Campbell's dwarf hamster and the winter white dwarf hamster are able to interbreed and produce live hybrid offspring. Although hybrids make suitable pets, the breeding of hybrids and cloning can cause health and reproduction problems. In addition, the widespread breeding and distribution of hybrids could threaten the existence of both pure species and subspecies of the ecosystem, resulting in only mongrels. Hybridizing causes each litter to become smaller and the young begin to form congenital problems.

== Conservation status ==
This hamster is listed as of Least Concern by the International Union for Conservation of Nature (IUCN). The population and distribution size are large, and no major or widespread threats to the species are known. Population numbers in the wild are not recorded.
