= Konstantin Satunin =

Russian zoologist

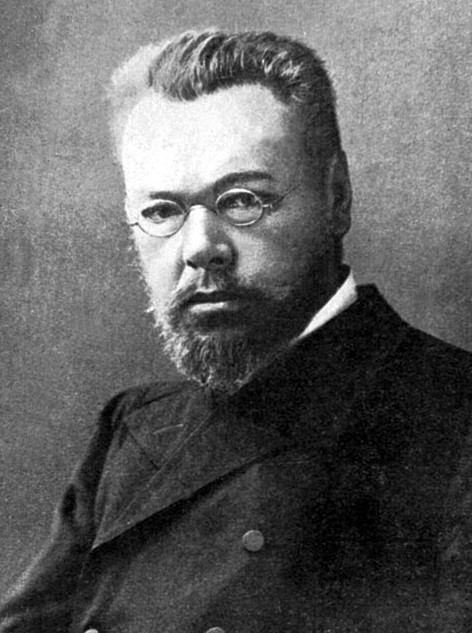
- Born: 20 May 1863; Yaroslavl, Russian empire
- Died: 10 November 1915 (aged 52); Mtskheta, Georgia
- Citizenship: Russian
- Known for: His research on the mammals of Russia and Central Asia
- Scientific career
- Fields: Zoology
- Institutions: Caucasus Sericultural Station
- Author abbrev. (zoology): Satunin

Konstantin Alekseevich Satunin (20 May 1863–10 November 1915) was a Russian zoologist who graduated at Moscow State University in 1890. From 1893 onward, he worked at a sericulture station in the Caucasus. He was a senior specialist at the Department of Agriculture between 1907 and 1915, concentrating on applied zoology and hunting in the Caucasus. He studied the mammals of Russia and Central Asia and published many works on the fauna of the Caucasus, mainly in the field of mammalogy but also entomology, herpetology, ichthyology, ornithology, sericulture, zoogeography, game management science and fishing. For example, he gave descriptions of a Caspian tiger from Prishibinskoye. He died suddenly of a heart attack in the vicinity of Mtskheta.

== See also ==
- Vratislav Mazák
