= Allocricetulus =

Scientific classification
- Kingdom: Animalia
- Phylum: Chordata
- Class: Mammalia
- Order: Rodentia
- Family: Cricetidae
- Subfamily: Cricetinae
- Genus: Allocricetulus (Argyropulo, 1932)

Type species
- Cricetus eversmanni Brandt, 1859

Species
- Allocricetulus curtatus Allocricetulus eversmanni

Genus of rodents

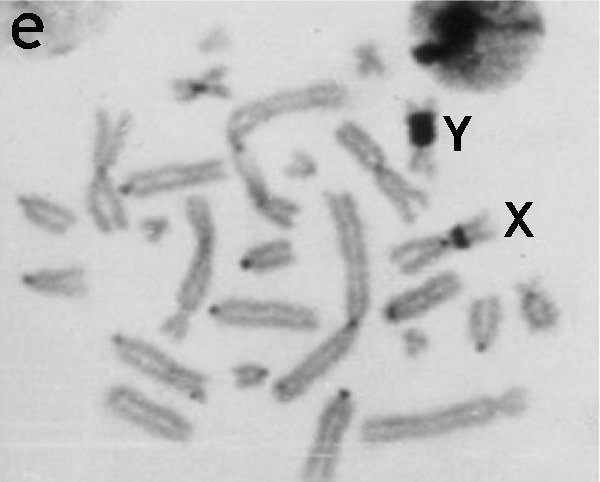
e. C-banded chromosomes of the Eversmann's hamster (Allocricetulus eversmanni, 2n = 26) with pericentomeric C-bands on the X and Y chromosomes.

Allocricetulus is a genus of hamsters in the family Cricetidae, which are found in Asia. It contains the following species: the Mongolian hamster (Allocricetulus curtatus) and the Eversmann's hamster (Allocricetulus eversmanni).
