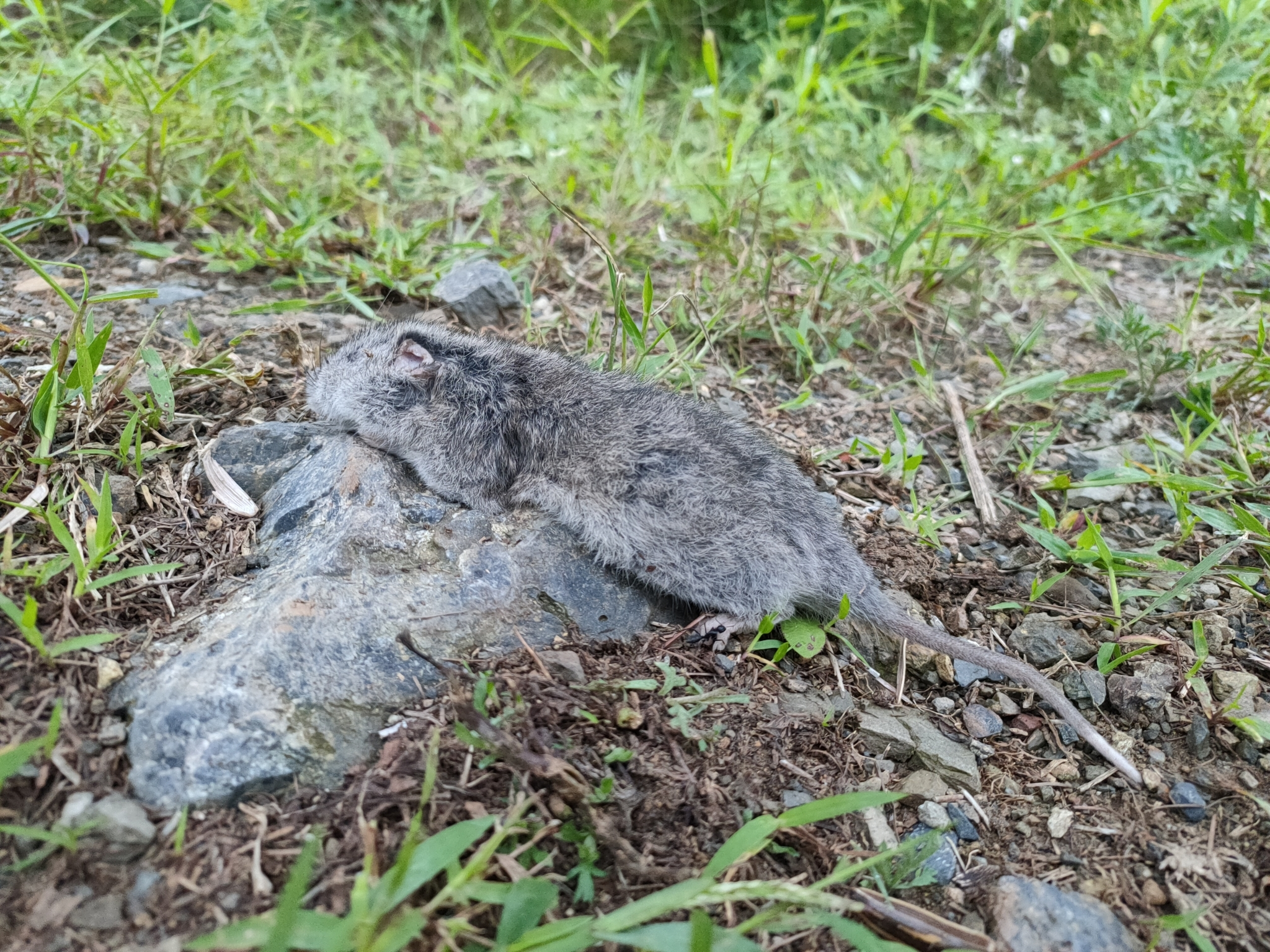

Conservation status
- Least Concern (IUCN 3.1)

Scientific classification
- Kingdom: Animalia
- Phylum: Chordata
- Class: Mammalia
- Infraclass: Placentalia
- Order: Rodentia
- Family: Cricetidae
- Subfamily: Cricetinae
- Genus: Tscherskia; Ognev, 1914
- Species: T. triton

Binomial name
- Tscherskia triton (de Winton, 1899)

= Greater long-tailed hamster =

Greater long-tailed hamster Temporal range: Late Pliocene to Recent

Species of rodent

The greater long-tailed hamster (Tscherskia triton) is a rodent native to Siberia, the Korean Peninsula, and China. It is the only member of the genus Tscherskia.

== Taxonomy ==
The genetic diversity of Tscherskia triton has a positive correlation to population density when using microsatellite markers.

== Conservation ==
Climate change and human activity have had an influence on the genetic variation of this species.

== Behavior ==
Male greater long-tailed hamsters exhibit high aggression during both the breeding and non-breeding seasons. Female greater long-tailed hamsters mainly show aggression during the non-breeding season.
