= Dwarf hamster =

Dwarf hamster may refer to:

- A member of any of the three species of genus Phodopus:
  - Campbell's dwarf hamster
  - Djungarian hamster
  - Roborovski hamster
- A member of certain species of genera Cricetulus, Nothocricetulus, or Urocricetus:
  - Tibetan dwarf hamster
  - Chinese dwarf hamster
  - Kam dwarf hamster
  - Long-tailed dwarf hamster
  - Grey dwarf hamster
  - Sokolov's dwarf hamster
