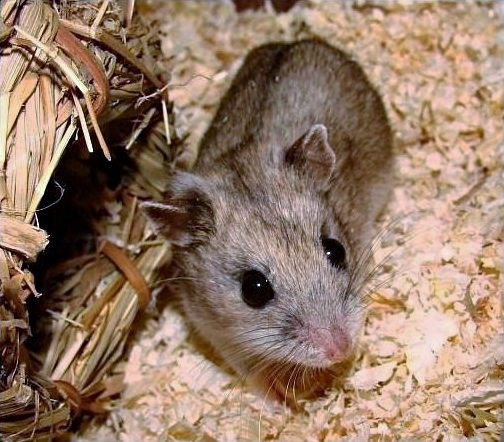
- A wild-type Chinese hamster

Conservation status
- Least Concern (IUCN 3.1)

Scientific classification
- Kingdom: Animalia
- Phylum: Chordata
- Class: Mammalia
- Order: Rodentia
- Family: Cricetidae
- Subfamily: Cricetinae
- Genus: Cricetulus
- Species: C. griseus

Binomial name
- Cricetulus griseus Milne-Edwards, 1867

= Chinese hamster =

Species of mammal

The Chinese hamster (Cricetulus griseus or Cricetulus barabensis griseus) is a rodent in the genus Cricetulus of the subfamily Cricetidae that originated in the deserts of northern China and Mongolia. They are distinguished by an uncommonly long tail in comparison to other hamsters, most of whose tails are stubby. Chinese hamsters are primarily nocturnal; however, they will stay awake for brief periods, in between naps, throughout the day.

== Description ==
Chinese hamsters grow to between 82 and 127 mm in body length (tail length 20–33 mm) and weigh 1.7 grams at birth, then as they get older can weigh 30–45 grams. Males have a fairly large scrotum relative to their body size. Their body proportions, compared to other hamster species – most of which tend to be compact – appear "long and thin" and they have (for a hamster) a relatively long tail. They live two to three years on average.

The wild color is brown with a black dorsal stripe down the spine, black and grey ticks and a whitish belly. This coloration, combined with their lithe build and longer tail, makes them look "mousy" to some eyes and, in fact, they are members of the group called ratlike hamsters.

Chinese hamsters and Chinese striped hamsters are solitary, like most hamsters other than the three Phodopus species. (Note: Confusingly, the name dwarf hamsters includes several other species in the same genus Cricetulus (Tibetan dwarf hamster, Kam dwarf hamster, Lama dwarf hamster, long-tailed dwarf hamster, grey dwarf hamster, Sokolov's dwarf hamster) as well as hamsters in the genus Phodopus, (Russian dwarf hamster, Campbell's dwarf hamster, Roborovski dwarf hamster). Often dwarf hamster is used to refer only to Phodopus. All of these hamsters are in the subfamily Cricetinae.)

== Taxonomy ==
The taxonomic names of the Chinese hamster and the closely related Chinese striped hamster are unsettled. Some authorities consider the Chinese hamster (C. griseus) and the Chinese striped hamster (C. barabensis) different species, whereas others classify them as subspecies, in which case the Latin name of the Chinese hamster becomes C. b. griseus, and the Chinese striped hamster becomes C. b. barabensis.

== Domestication ==
Chinese hamsters were first domesticated as lab animals, but have mostly fallen out of use. They were subsequently kept as pets (although not the pet hamster species commonly kept in North America).

=== Lab animals ===
Early use of Chinese hamsters as laboratory animals included research of pneumocci and visceral leishmaniasis. Inbred lines of Chinese hamsters were found to spontaneously develop diabetes, causing it to be used as model organism. Cells from the Chinese hamster's ovaries were isolated in 1958 and cultured in vitro. They were chosen due to their low number of chromosomes which allowed for easier observation. Since then, Chinese hamster ovary cells are a commonly used tool in biological and biochemical research as well as production platform for biopharmaceuticals.

=== Pets ===
Female Chinese hamsters were generally kept as pets, and males used solely for breeding. Being naturally solitary, they tend to be aggressive if kept in enclosures which are too small, or are inhabited by other hamsters.

=== Prohibitions ===
Some U.S. states, such as California and New Jersey, regard the Chinese hamster as a pest or an exotic animal, and require a special permit to own, breed or sell them.

=== Colour varieties ===
Besides the wild colour, a well-known variation in domesticated breeds is the "spotted white" or "dominant spot" Chinese hamster, which often is grayish-white all over, with only a dark stripe on its back.

As yet, there are only three colour varieties among domesticated Chinese hamsters:

- normal / wild type
- dominant spot or spotted white
- black-eyed white
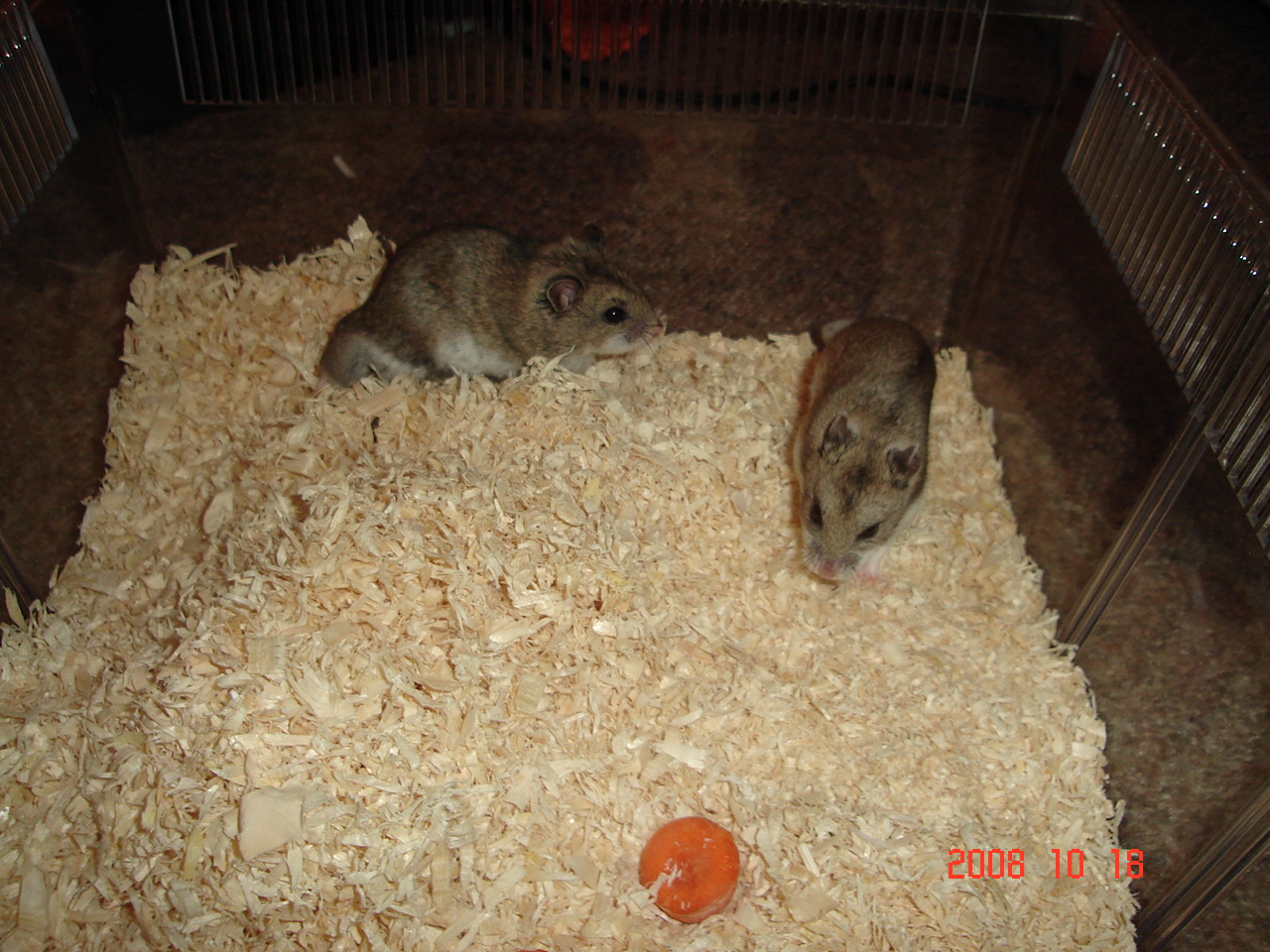
normal / wild-type (note the large scrotum, left)

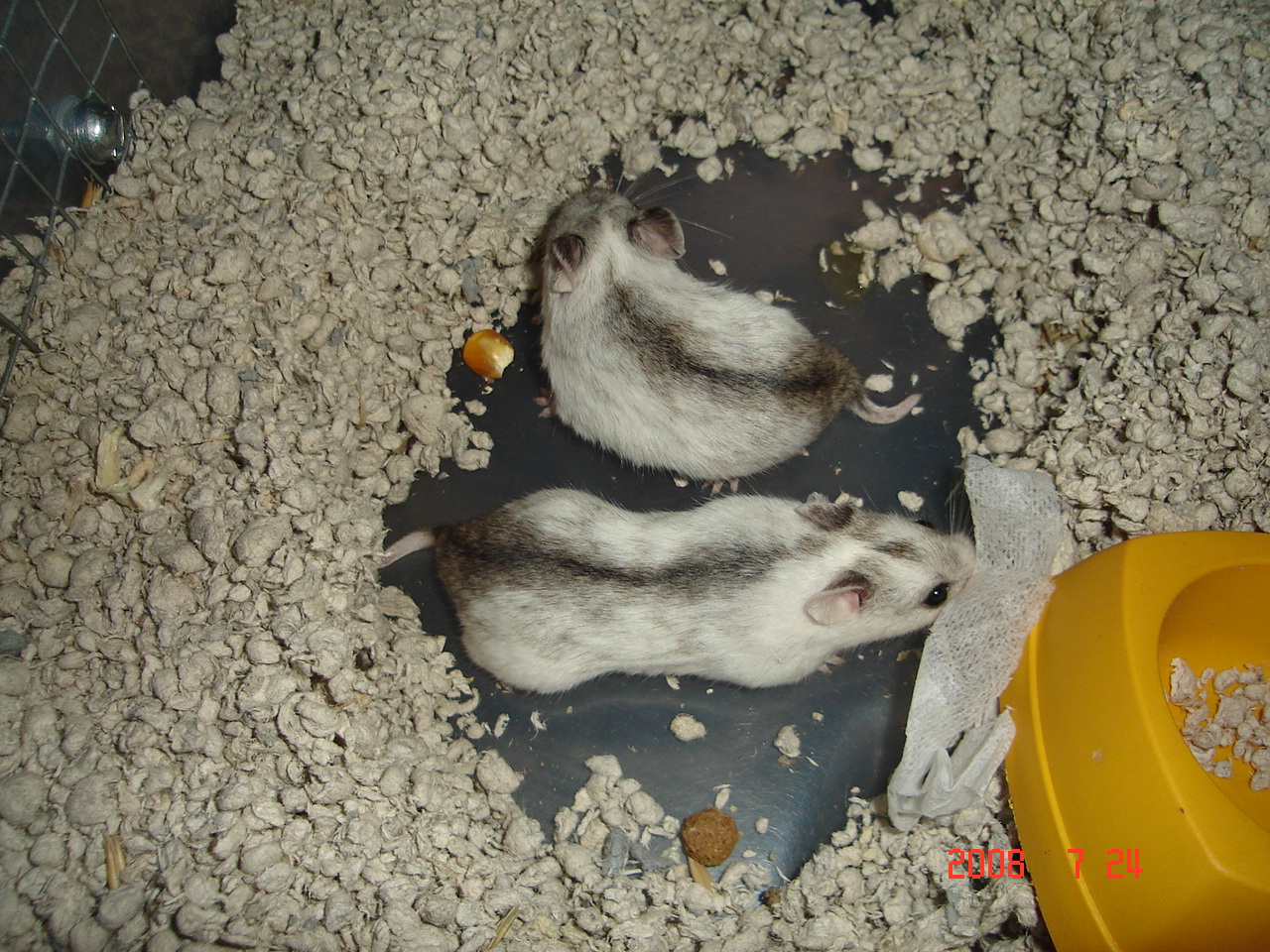
dominant spot or spotted white (note the tail lengths)

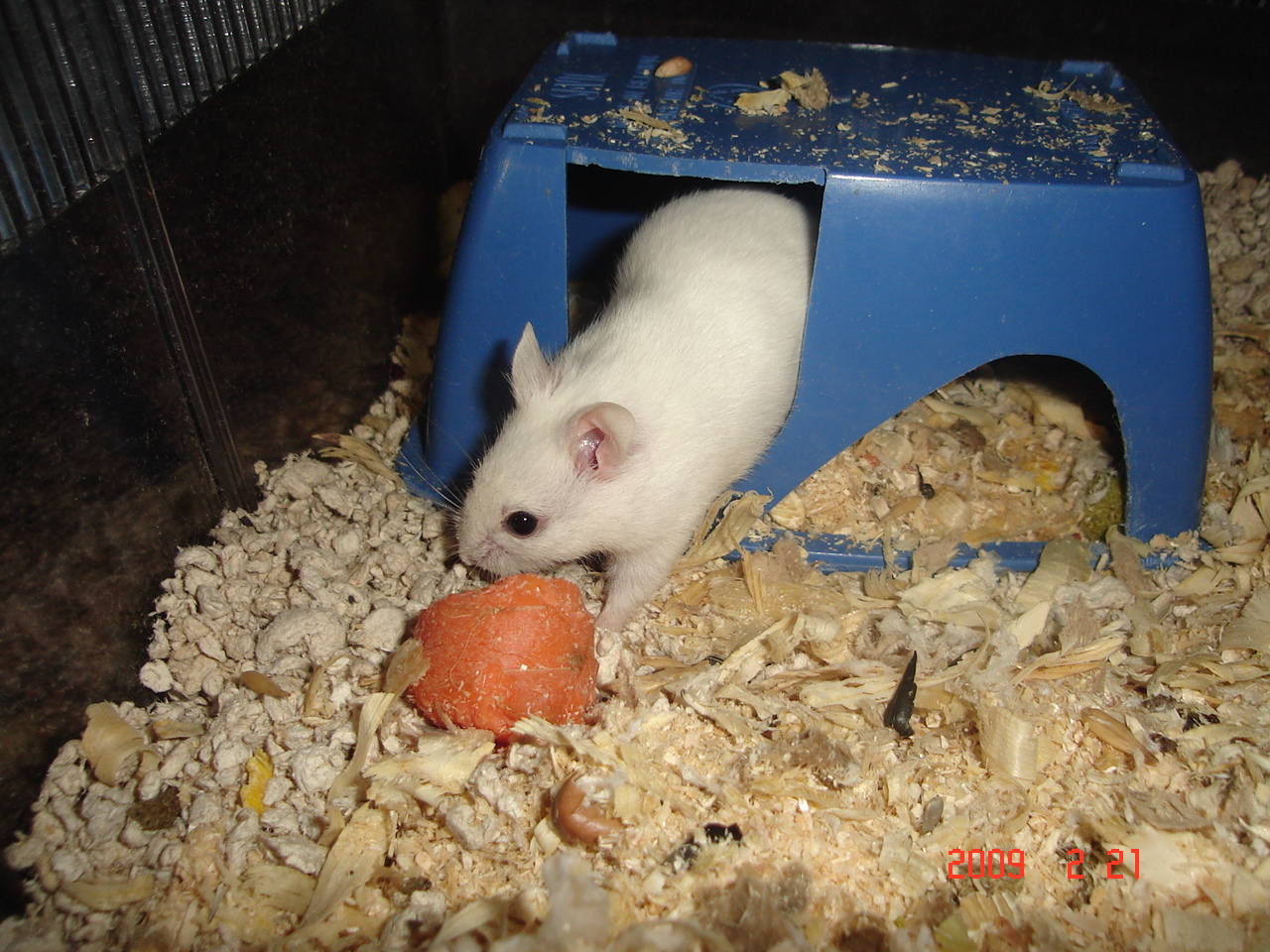
black-eyed white

Normal and dominant spot are readily available in the pet trade throughout the United Kingdom, whereas the black-eyed white is extremely rare; only a few are owned by hobbyist breeders in the U.K.

== In media ==
The Chinese dwarf hamster is the animal of choice featured in the speculative evolution project Hamster's Paradise.

== See also ==
- Chinese hamster ovary cell
- Chinese striped hamster
