= List of mammals of Tibet =

This is a list of the mammal species recorded in Tibet. There are 30 mammal species in Tibet, all of which are adapted to the country's low temperatures and high elevations.

The following tags are used to highlight each species' conservation status as assessed by the International Union for Conservation of Nature:

EX	Extinct	No reasonable doubt that the last individual has died.
EW	Extinct in the wild	Known only to survive in captivity or as a naturalized populations well outside its previous range.
CR	Critically endangered	The species is in imminent risk of extinction in the wild.
EN	Endangered	The species is facing an extremely high risk of extinction in the wild.
VU	Vulnerable	The species is facing a high risk of extinction in the wild.
NT	Near threatened	The species does not meet any of the criteria that would categorise it as risking extinction but it is likely to do so in the future.
LC	Least concern	There are no current identifiable risks to the species.
DD	Data deficient	There is inadequate information to make an assessment of the risks to this species.

Some species were assessed using an earlier set of criteria. Species assessed using this system have the following instead of near threatened and least concern categories:

LR/cd	Lower risk/conservation dependent	Species which were the focus of conservation programmes and may have moved into a higher risk category if that programme was discontinued.
LR/nt	Lower risk/near threatened	Species which are close to being classified as vulnerable but are not the subject of conservation programmes.
LR/lc	Lower risk/least concern	Species for which there are no identifiable risks.

== Order: Rodentia (rodents) ==
The order Rodentia is the largest group of mammals. They have two ever-growing incisors in the upper as well as in the lower jaw and must be kept worn down by gnawing.

- Family: Cricetidae
  - Subfamily: Arvicolinae (lemmings)
    - Genus: Eolagurus
      - Przewalski's steppe lemming, Eolagurus przewalskii LC
  - Subfamily: Cricetinae (hamsters)
    - Genus: Urocricetus
      - Tibetan dwarf hamster, Urocricetus alticola LC
      - Kam dwarf hamster, Urocricetus kamensis LC
- Family: Sciuridae
    - Genus: Marmota (marmots)
      - Himalayan marmot, Marmota himalayana LC
    - Genus: Eupetaurus (woolly flying squirrels)
      - Tibetan woolly flying squirrel, Eupetaurus tibetensis DD

== Order: Lagomorpha (rabbits, hares and pikas) ==
Lagomorpha comprises rabbits, hares and pikas, which differ from rodents by having four incisors in the upper jaw and strictly herbivore diet.

- Family: Leporidae (rabbits and hares)
  - Genus: Lepus
    - Woolly hare, L. oiostolus NT
- Family: Ochotonidae (pikas)
  - Genus: Ochotona
    - Gansu pika, O. cansus NT
    - Plateau pika, O. curzoniae NT
    - Tsing-ling pika, O. huangensis NT
    - Glover's pika, O. gloveri NT

== Order: Artiodactyla (even-toed ungulates) ==
The order Artiodactyla in Tibet are mainly herbivores, and some are economically important as transport animals.

- Family: Bovidae
  - Subfamily: Antilopinae (antelopes)
  - Genus: Procapra
    - Tibetan gazelle, Procapra picticaudata NT
    - Przewalski's gazelle, Procapra przewalskii EN
  - Genus: Gazella
    - Goitered gazelle, Gazella subgutturosa VU
  - Genus: Pantholops
    - Tibetan antelope, Pantholops hodgsonii NT
  - Subfamily: Bovinae (cattle, buffaloes and allies)
  - Genus: Bos
    - Domestic yak, Bos grunniens NT
- Family: Cervidae (deer)
  - Subfamily: Cervinae
  - Genus: Cervus
    - Thorold's deer, Cervus albirostris VU
    - Kansu red deer, Cervus canadensis kansuensis LC
    - Sichuan deer, Cervus canadensis macneilli LC
- Family: Capridae (goats and sheep)
  - Subfamily: Caprinae
  - Genus: Pseudois
    - Bharal, Pseudois nayaur LC
  - Genus: Ovis
    - Argali, Ovis ammon NT

== Order: Perissodactyla (odd-toed ungulates) ==
The order Perissodactyla in Tibet is only comprised by a single species.

- Family: Equidae (horses)
  - Subfamily: Equinae
  - Genus: Equus
    - Kiang, Equus kiang LC

== Order: Carnivora (carnivorans) ==
There are over 250 species of carnivorans, which are the top predators in the food webs.

- Suborder: Feliformia
  - Family: Felidae (cats)
    - Subfamily: Felinae
      - Genus: Felis
        - Feral cat, Felis catus domesticated
      - Genus: Otocolobus
        - Pallas's cat, Otocolobus manul NT
      - Genus: Lynx
        - Eurasian lynx, Lynx linx LC
    - Subfamily: Pantherinae
      - Genus: Panthera
        - Snow leopard, Panthera uncia EN
- Suborder: Caniformia
  - Family: Canidae (dogs, wolves, jackals and foxes)
    - Subfamily: Caninae
      - Genus: Canis
        - Feral dog, Canis lupus familiaris domesticated
        - Tibetan wolf, Canis lupus filchneri LC
      - Genus: Vulpes
        - Tibetan sand fox, Vulpes ferrilata LC
        - Red fox, Vulpes vulpes LC
  - Family: Mustelidae (weasels, otters, badgers and allies)
    - Subfamily: Mustelinae
      - Genus: Meles
        - Asian badger, Meles leucurus LC

== See also ==
- Wildlife of China
- List of mammals of China
- List of chordate orders
- Mammal classification
- Lists of mammals by region
- List of prehistoric mammals
- List of mammals described in the 2000s
