= Gadd7 =

Non-coding RNA

gadd7
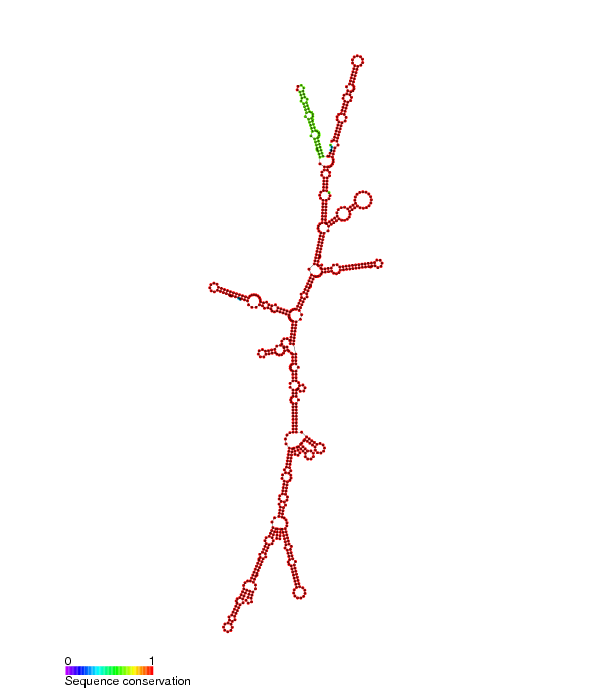
- Conserved secondary structure of gadd7 RNA

Identifiers
- Symbol: gadd7
- Rfam: RF01800

Other data
- RNA type: Gene
- Domain: Cricetulus
- PDB structures: PDBe

gadd7 (growth arrested DNA-damage inducible gene 7) is a non-coding RNA discovered in the ovaries of the chinese hamster (Cricetulus griseus). Homologs have been identified in the closely related Long-tailed Dwarf Hamster (C. longicaudatus). Although the gene for this RNA contains open reading frames, translation studies found no protein product hence gadd7 has been classified as non-coding RNA.

gadd7 was previously characterised as a hydrogen peroxide-inducible transcript but has more recently been linked with lipotoxicity - where the accumulation of lipids in non-adipose tissue brings about cell death. gadd7 appears to be a key element in the lipotoxicty pathway, when it is knocked out the resulting mutant is much more resistant to oxidative stress.

The proposed mechanism for gadd7's role in lipotoxicity is:

1. The lipid palmitate builds to high concentration within a cell
2. Reactive oxygen species (ROS) are generated
3. This stress induces the expression of gadd7
4. A feed-forward mechanism occurs
5. ER stress brings about death of the cell
