= Fancy mouse =

Mouse that has been selectively bred for exhibition

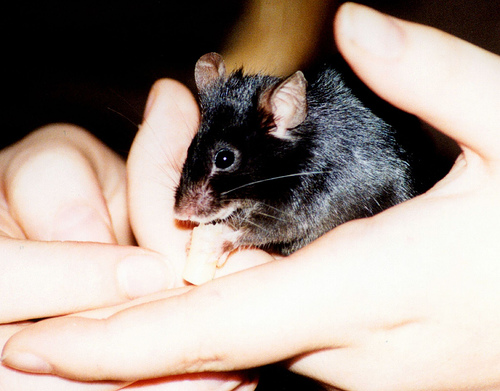
A black pet mouse in a hand

A fancy mouse is a domesticated form of the house mouse (Mus musculus), one of many species of mice, usually kept as a type of pocket pet. Fancy mice have also been specially bred for exhibiting, with shows being held internationally. A pet mouse is inexpensive compared to larger pets, and even many other pet rodents, but mice are comparatively short-lived: typically only 2 to 3 years.

== Description ==
The term fancy mouse is used to describe a mouse that has been selectively bred for exhibition. Wild-caught specimens that become docile and are bred for many generations still fall under the fancy type. Fancy mice can vary greatly in size, from small pet mice that are approximately 5–8 cm (2–3 in) long from nose to the proximal start of the tail, to show mice that measure 8 cm (3.1 in) nose to tail. Pet mice weigh about 29–44 g (1.0–1.6 oz).

=== Varieties ===
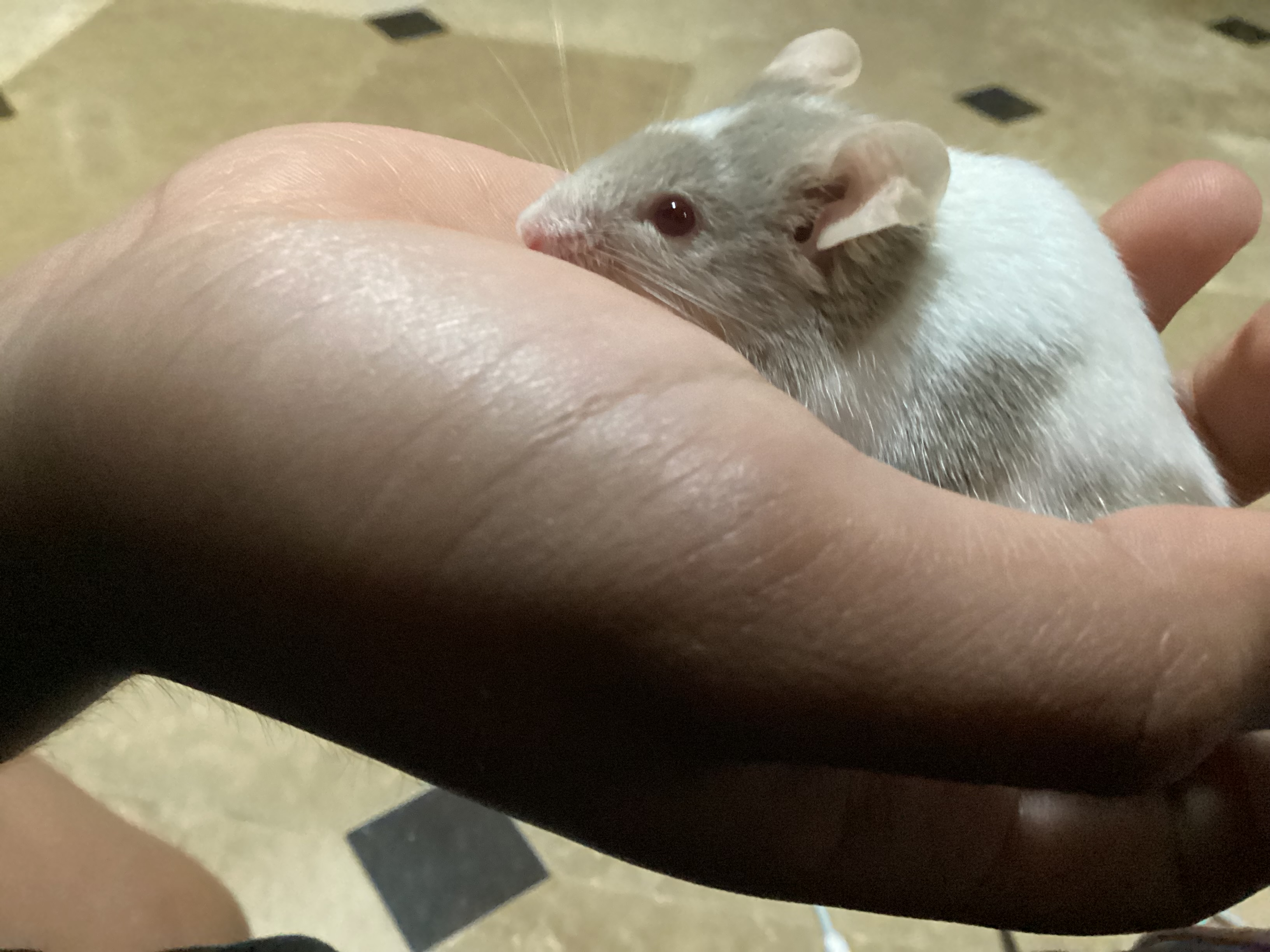
Albinistic mouse (notice the red eyes) with cream colored patches

Artificial selection in fancy mice has created numerous available fur colours. These include colours like black, chocolate, blue, white, cream, lilac, red, fawn, champagne, cinnamon, golden agouti, silver agouti, silver, and dove. Depending on its colouration, a fancy mouse may have black or pink eyes.

Fancy mice have also been bred to exhibit multiple kinds of markings. Which of these markings are standardized and what those standards are, can vary from club to club. While not a comprehensive list of fancy mouse patterns, some notable markings in fancy mice include even marked mice (white mice with even patches of colour), broken marked mice (white mice with uneven patches of colour), banded mice (coloured mice with a band of white around their midsection), rump white mice (coloured mice with a white rump), Hereford mice (coloured mice with completely white faces and a white marking on the underside, resembling Hereford cattle), and Dutch mice (white mice with a coloured rump and cheek patches, resembling a Dutch rabbit). Mice with completely coloured undersides may be referred to as tan mice (when the underside colouration is a rich orange colour) or fox mice (when the underside colouration is white or near white). Completely solid coloured mice are referred to as self mice.

In addition to colouration, fancy mice exhibit multiple different coat types, referred to as varieties. Most fancy mice fall under the Standard variety, meaning that their coat is short, straight, smooth, and close to the body. However, some may be Satin mice (coats that are similar to Standard mice, but with higher sheen), Long Hair mice (Standard or Satin coats that are longer than usual), curly or wavy haired (specific names for these varieties vary depending on club), or even hairless.

== Pet mice ==
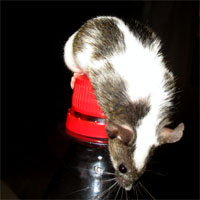
This mismarked Dutch shows that fancy mice may be coloured and have markings not found in wild mice

The first written reference to mice kept as pets occurs in the Erya, the oldest extant Chinese dictionary, from a mention in an 1100 B.C. version. In Europe the breeding of fancy mice became popular through the introduction of Japanese stock in the early 17th century. By 1895, Walter Maxey founded the National Mouse Club in Victorian England, with its first official show held in Lincoln that year. Since that time, mouse clubs have formed worldwide. Shows are held so competitive breeders can display their mice, where they are judged on colour, body shape and behaviour.

Mice are kept as pets in many countries for a number of reasons: Fancy mice are relatively small, inexpensive, never need bathing, and can learn to enjoy regular handling if provided with the correct care. Female mice are popular with many owners, since they tend to co-habitate with other mice better than males. Additionally, the urine of female fancy mice does not contain as strong an odor as that of male mice. Bucks will often fight with and kill each other when housed together, despite being raised together, due to their very strong and unchangeable territorial instincts. It is difficult to house male mice together without the risk of injury to one or both males. Some people, however, prefer the personality and curiosity of male mice. It is a good idea to keep fancy mice in groups of at least two if possible, as mice are sociable animals. However, if a buck and a doe of breeding age are put in the same cage, it is possible for them to reproduce at a maximum frequency of once every three weeks. Litters of five to 18 are not unusual.

== Health ==
A healthy fancy mouse will live on average 18 to 30 months, depending on genetic predisposition. Like most mammals, mice are susceptible to fleas, mites, ticks, and other skin parasites, as well as intestinal parasites. The most common mites in fancy mice are: Myobia musculi, Myocoptes musculinus, and Rhadfordia affinis. The cage should be cleaned regularly, and preferably treated with anti-mite spray. Mice are particularly sensitive to drafts and may pick up colds and other flu-like conditions. Mice can also over-groom when stressed, leading to skin irritations and fur loss. In severe cases, mice may cause themselves injury with obsessive scratching. One of the best methods of treating this disorder is trimming the mouse's toenails, which will prevent it from causing itself further harm. Older mice (older than a year) are susceptible to tumors, especially breast cancer in females, as the mammary tissue is distributed around much of the body. Other common cancers in mice are leukemia and lymphoma. The reason that mice, as well as many other small animals get ill easier is due to their genomes containing more viruses. Persistent problems should be referred to a veterinarian, although finding a veterinarian with experience in treating mice can be difficult.

Fancy mice can become obese if they overeat and do not get enough physical activity. This can lead to them developing life-threatening cardiovascular disorders and diabetes as well as arthritis. Activity aids, such as tubes and wheels, are useful for ensuring mice get enough exercise, as well as mental stimulation. Mice also love to climb, and a wire cage with horizontal bars is perfect for this. A mouse set loose for exercise should be carefully observed, as they tend to scurry into a hiding spot and can be difficult to retrieve.

As rodents, mice must gnaw to keep their incisors from growing too long. Overgrown teeth can cause occlusion (blockage) of the mouth, which in extreme cases can lead to starvation. Hard foodstuffs, small pieces of wood or specially prepared blocks can suit this purpose, although some mice can grind their teeth together (bruxism) to keep them short. In rare cases, a mouse may not be able to gnaw effectively, either from malformed incisors or jaws, and so its teeth must be trimmed by a veterinarian.

Mice self-groom and do not need to be bathed, unless they have a skin condition which requires special treatment.

Mice can also get diarrhea. For humans in developed countries with access to clean water, this is usually not a life-threatening condition. For mice though, it can be. Diarrhea in mice is more likely to cause dehydration and death than it is in humans, due to their small size.

== Breeding ==
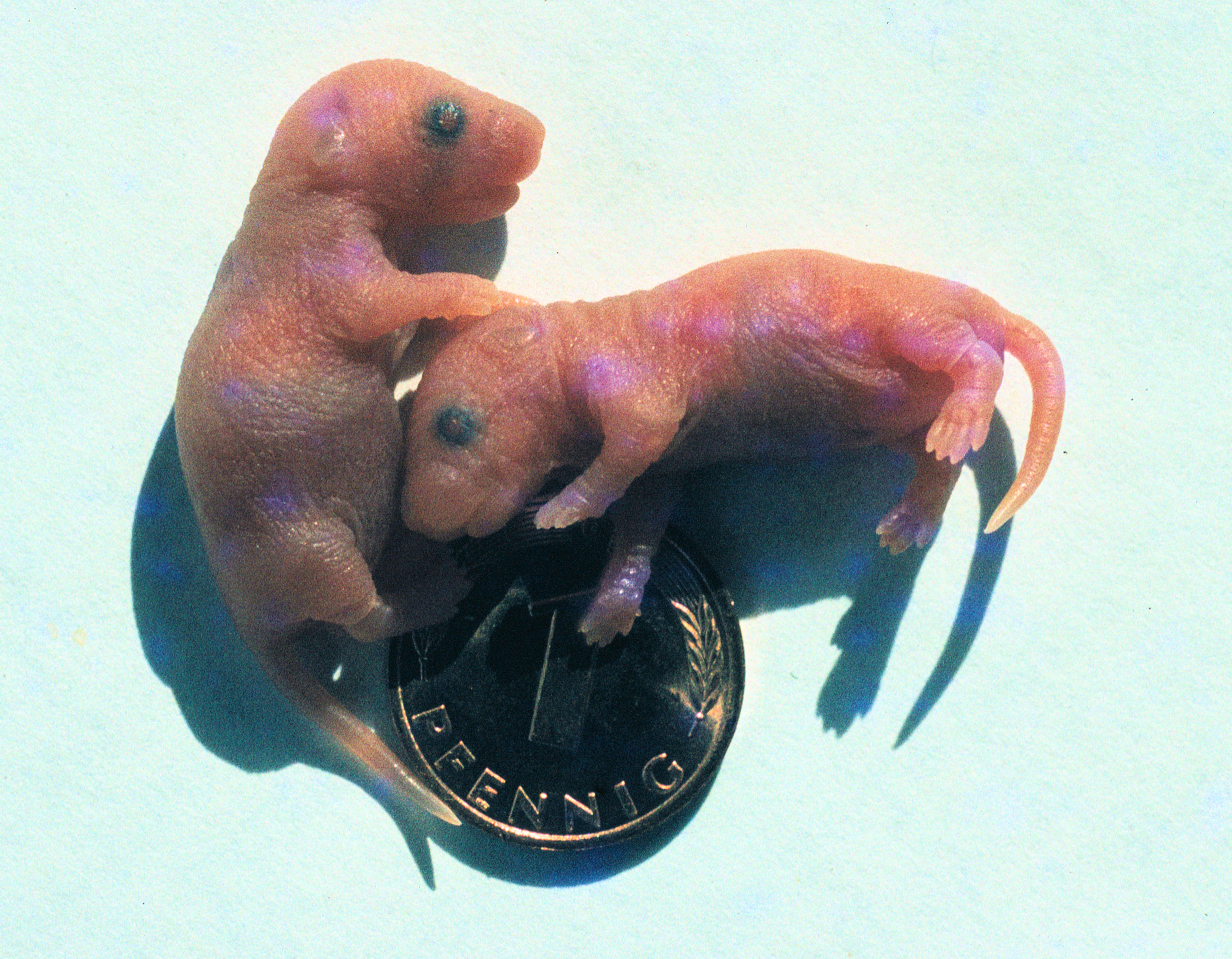
Two fancy mouse pups (pinkies) with a coin for scale

Mice have a rapid reproduction rate; the gestation period is 19 to 23 days. The average litter size is 4 to 12 young. In some instances, up to 30 young have been born. However females have 10 nipples so may only feed this many pups at any one time. The pups in larger litters are often weaker, smaller animals that can weaken the doe, increasing recovery time. Litters can be humanely culled to 10-12 mice at the very most. Males can mate with the female as soon as the litter is born, which means that a female could become pregnant with another litter within three days of giving birth. Female mice should not be bred before 12 weeks or after eight months; doing so can be very dangerous, and some mice can die while giving birth. Females come into heat around every three to five days, so the pair can be kept together for up to 10 days. Baby mice, called pinkies or pups, are born blind, deaf, and naked. Their eyes are closed and their ears are stuck to the sides of their heads. Mothers may eat any dead or sickly offspring. Pups begin to grow hair at 2 to 4 days. Ears open at 3 to 5 days, and the pups will start vocalising. Eyes open at 14 days, and the pups will start exploring the world around them. At 3 weeks old, they look like miniature versions of adult mice. At 4 weeks the males in the litter should be removed, lest they impregnate their mother and sisters, while the females can be left with the mother.

== Showing ==
There are several clubs all over the world who host shows for mice, similar to rat shows. Shows are most commonly held in the U.S., the U.K., and Australia. Clubs include the FMBA (Fancy Mouse Breeders' Association) and AFRMA (American Fancy Rat and Mouse Association) in the United States and NMC (National Mouse Club) in the United Kingdom.

A quote from the NMC describes the ideal mouse body type for showing: "The mouse must be long on body with long clean head, not too fine or pointed at the nose, the eyes should be large, bold and prominent. The ears large and tulip shaped, free from creases, carried erect with plenty of width between them. The body should be long and slim, a trifle arched over the loin and racy in appearance; the tail, which must be free from kinks should come well out of the back and be thick at the root or set-on, gradually tapering like a whip lash to a fine end, the length being about equal to that of the mouse's body. Unless the variety standard states otherwise, the coat should be short perfectly smooth, glossy and sleek to the hand. The mouse should be perfectly tractable and free from any vice and not subject to fits or other similar ailments. A mouse with absence of whiskers, blind in one or both eyes, carrying external parasites, having a tumor, sore or legs with fur missing, suffering from any obvious disease or deformity or kinked tail shall be disqualified."

== Pet care ==
=== Caging ===
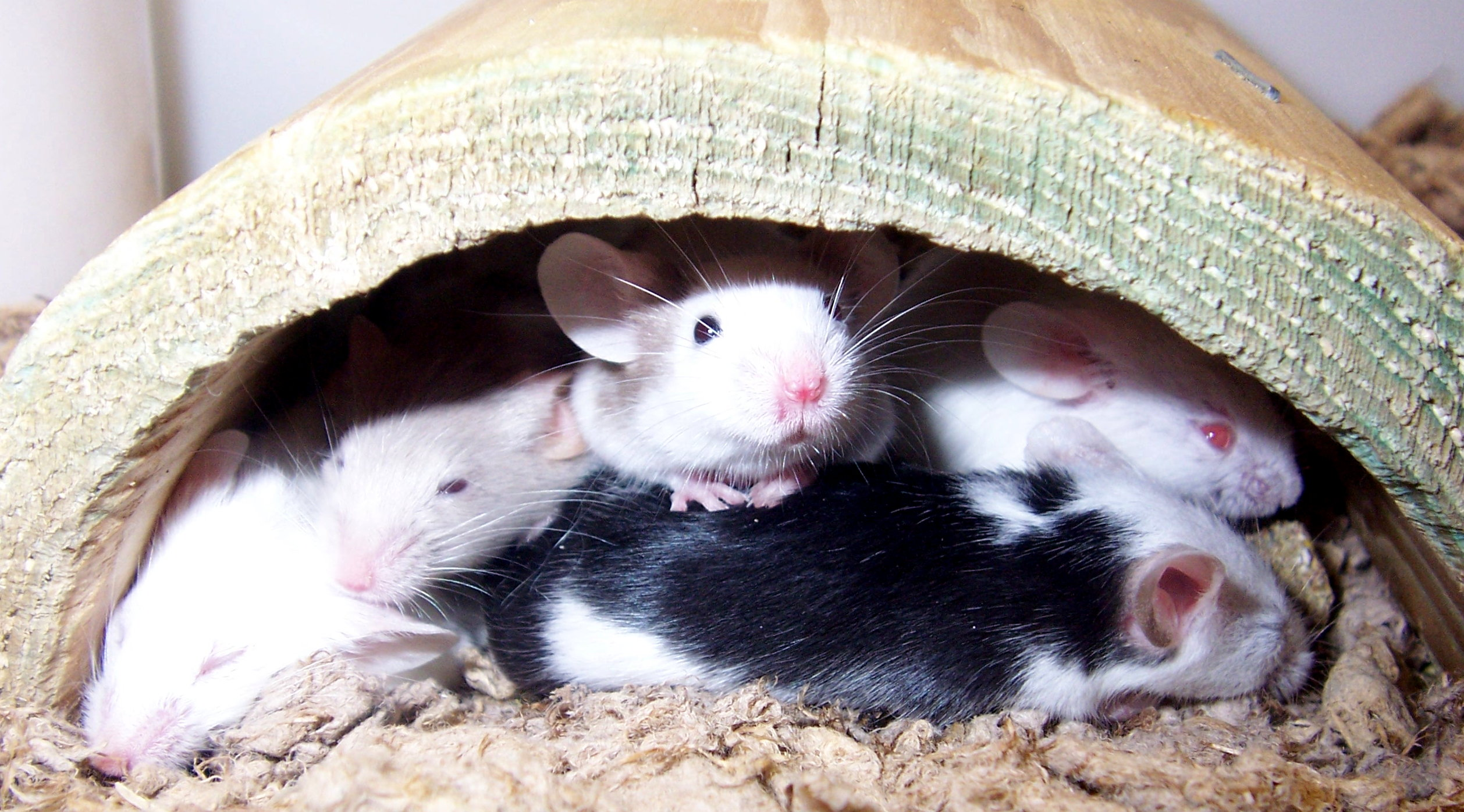
Mice enjoy group housing and require nesting areas such as this wooden hide.

A cage with wire bars and plastic flooring is the most common type of housing. A span between cage bars of less than 5 mm (0.20 in) prevents young mice from attempting to escape by forcing themselves through the bars, where they may get stuck. This can also help prevent predatory pets, such as cats, dogs, arthropods, snakes, and other carnivores, from killing and eating the mice.

Mice are naturally cautious of rats, who may kill and consume them. This behaviour is known as muricide (cf. Muricidal test). The mouse cage should be cleaned every week to prevent odour and disinfected only if a mouse has been unwell to prevent infection and disease. In the wild, mice are able to co-exist with other small rodent species. Compared with larger mammals, the mouse's small body makes it difficult to regulate body temperature effectively. Thus, drafts and large fluctuations in temperature can adversely affect the health of mice.

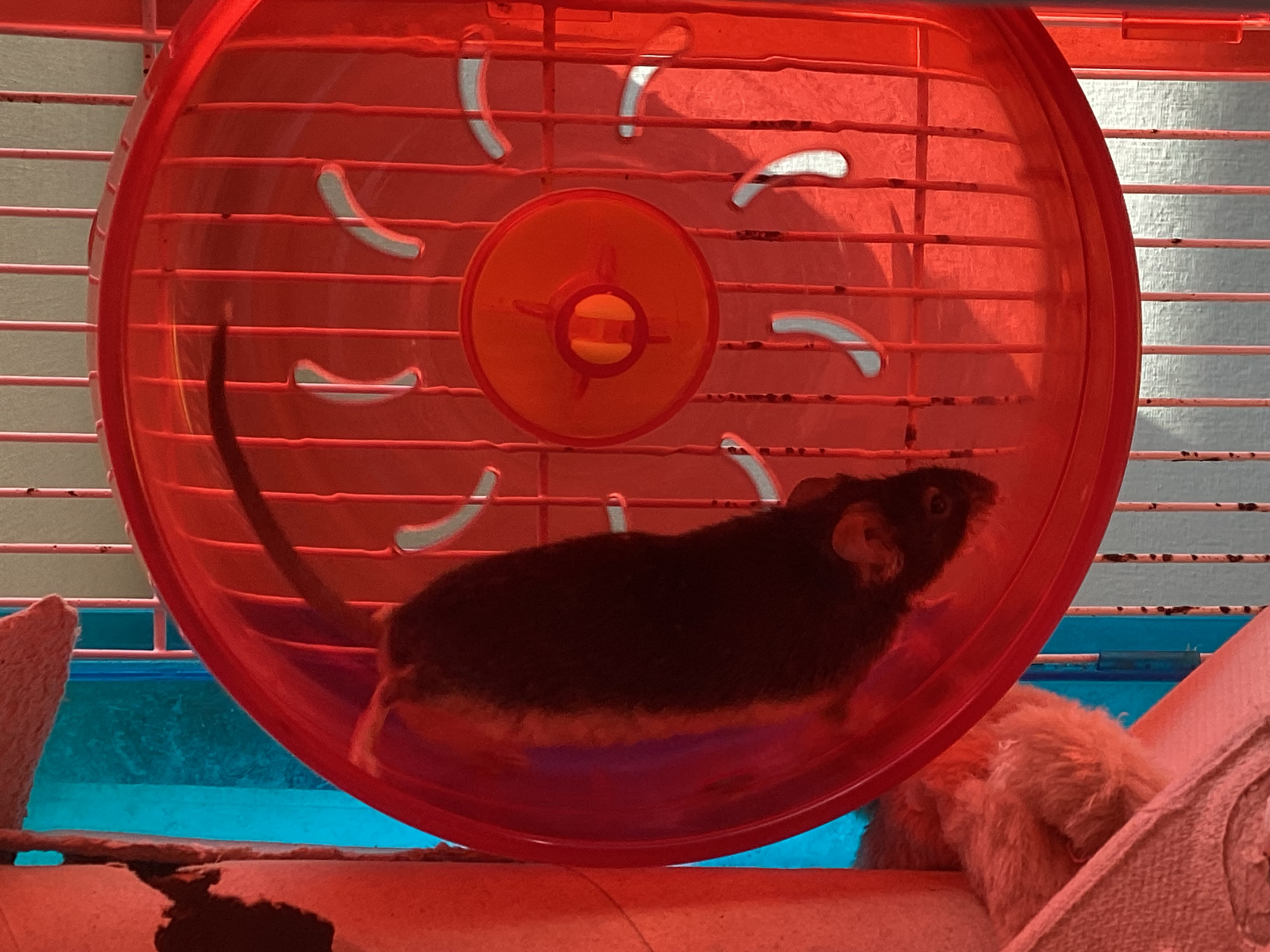
A black colored mouse runs on his wheel

The best products for use in cage bedding are aspen wood shavings. Paper-pulp-based products are also available, as well as a variety of recycled products, though newspaper products may contain inks, dyes and other chemicals from the paper making process. Cedar and pine, even kiln-dried, should not be used as they release aromatic oils that damage the respiratory system and can cause or exacerbate chronic respiratory disease. Recent research suggests that paper-pulp bedding may allow very high concentrations of ammonia to build up in cages, especially those with little ventilation. Small hideaways and toys (such as a cardboard tube) are good to have in the cage. Commercial toys are also available. Mice love to run on a wheel, which provides stimulation as well as exercise.

In the U.K., most show breeders keep their mice in wooden boxes measuring about 18 inches (460 mm) by 12 inches (300 mm) by 7 inches (180 mm), although there has been increasing use of plastic storage boxes.

=== Feeding ===
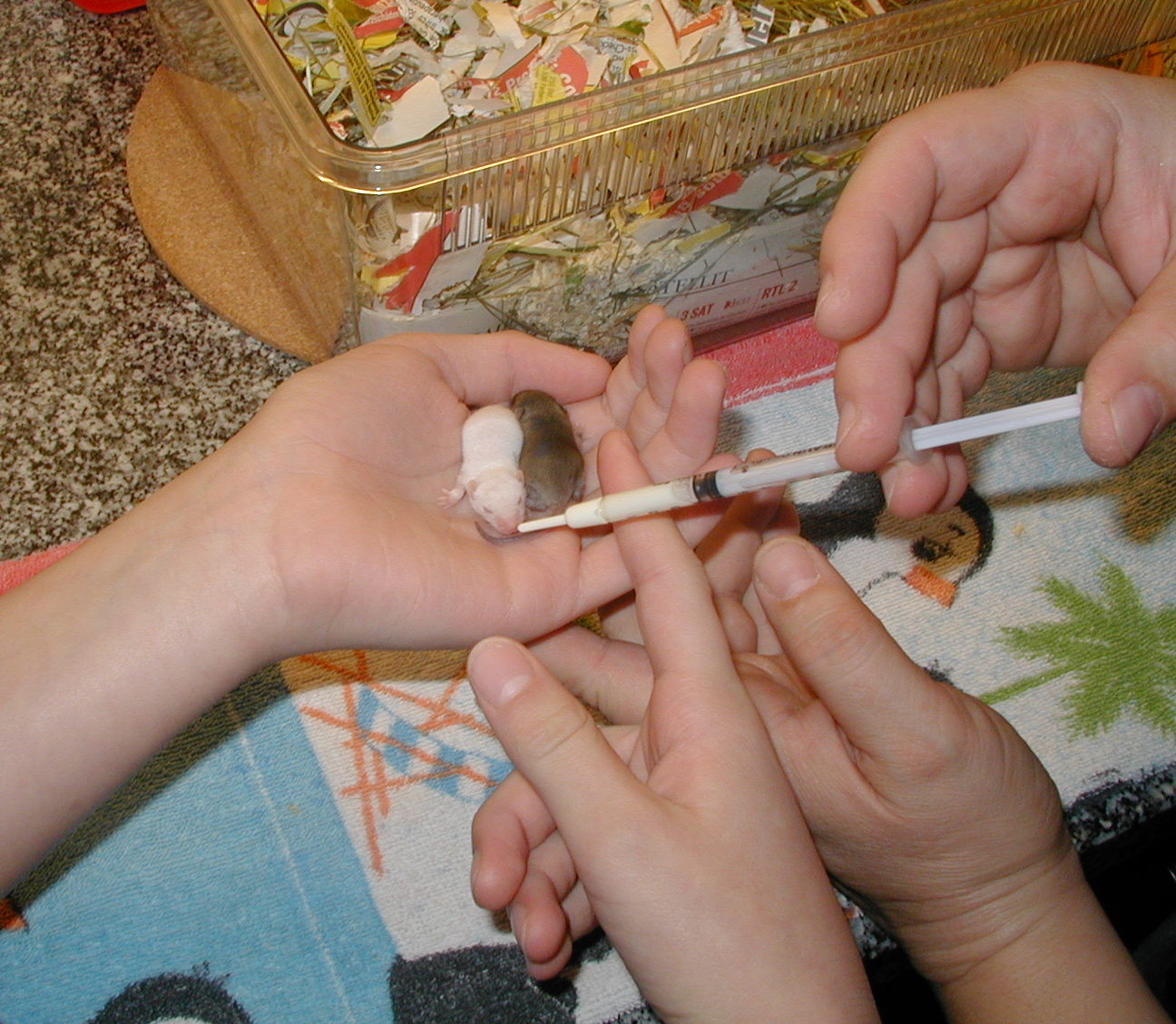
Hand-feeding 10-day-old pinkies

Food for fancy mice can range from specially formulated feed mix to kitchen scraps. Carrot, spinach, lettuce and other vegetables are often enjoyed by mice but should be given sparingly as such foods can result in diarrhoea and life-threatening dehydration. Bread crumbs, wheat and rice can also be good for mice. Laboratories keeping mice as experimental subjects almost uniformly use a product called lab block, a scientifically formulated blend originally designed for mice in laboratories. In order to keep variety in their diets, mice can also eat oats, oily seeds, clean eggshell, breakfast cereal, and stale bread. Fruit and vegetables are part of a more natural and healthful diet. Some owners give it to them as a treat after they do a trick. Mice often chew wood and other hard substances, which keeps their teeth from growing too long. As mice and rats have similar diets, some pet mouse owners choose to feed them rat food. Although it is common practice to feed premixed diets designed for other rodents, for the longevity and health of the animal it is best to feed mouse-targeted diets. Diets for hamsters, for instance, are known to contain higher protein than what is required for mice or rats.

House mice primarily feed on plant matter, but they will also accept meat and dairy products. Meats are full of protein and are good for pregnant or nursing mice. They will drink water, but require little of it, relying mainly on the moisture present in their food. If a water source is provided, then a gravity bottle feeder is necessary for maintaining the cleanliness of the water supply. They will eat their feces to acquire nutrients produced by bacteria in their intestines, a behavior they share with rabbits and guinea pigs called coprophagy. House mice, like other rodents, do not vomit.

=== Handling ===
Although mice are small animals and care must be taken to avoid injury, they are also surprisingly robust and inquisitive. Once out of the cage many enjoy running along their owners' arms, investigating pockets, or just sitting on the owner's lap and grooming. Some mice also tolerate gentle petting. Care must be taken, as mice have poor eyesight and may try to lean too far over an edge and fall. Care must especially be taken when being handled by small children, as they may be overly rough. Fancy mice very rarely bite except when hurt or very frightened. Biting behaviour may result from improper handling, as they are generally considered non-aggressive. Mice, especially males who are wild and territorial, have a greater likelihood of biting unfamiliar people.

Mice cannot be house trained and will often defecate and urinate while first being handled, especially if they are nervous. The feces of a healthy mouse consist of a relatively innocuous solid pellet a few millimetres long. However, their urine is often pungent, particularly with males, and can stain fabric.

== See also ==
- Fancy rat
- Laboratory mouse
- Laboratory rat
- Mus musculus domesticus
- Mouse
- Animal fancy
- Fancy pigeon
- Golden mouse
- Rodents as pets
