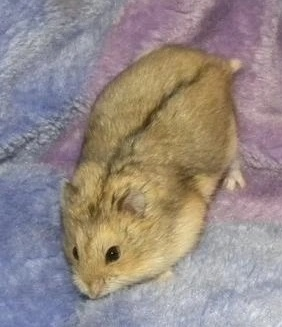

Conservation status
- Least Concern (IUCN 3.1)

Scientific classification
- Kingdom: Animalia
- Phylum: Chordata
- Class: Mammalia
- Infraclass: Placentalia
- Order: Rodentia
- Family: Cricetidae
- Subfamily: Cricetinae
- Genus: Phodopus
- Species: P. campbelli

Binomial name
- Phodopus campbelli (Thomas, 1905)
- Campbell's dwarf hamster range

Synonyms
- Phodopus tuvinicus Orlov & Iskharova, 1974; Phodopus crepidatus Hollister, 1912

= Campbell's dwarf hamster =

Species of hamster

Campbell's dwarf hamster (Phodopus campbelli) is a species of hamster in the genus Phodopus. It was given its common name by Oldfield Thomas in honor of Charles William Campbell, who collected the first specimen in Mongolia on July 1, 1902. It is almost physically indistinguishable from the closely related P.sungorus, but can be distinguished by its use of biparental care. Campbell's dwarf hamster typically has a narrow dorsal stripe compared to P.sungorus and brown or gray fur on the stomach. This hamster may be raised in captivity and kept as a small pet.

In the wild, the breeding season for Campbell's dwarf hamster varies by location. For example, the breeding season begins towards the middle of April in Tuva and towards the end of April in Mongolia. However, there is no fixed breeding season in captivity, and they can breed frequently throughout the year. Females are usually sexually mature at two months, and the gestation period is typically 20 days. Campbell's dwarf hamster is crepuscular, along with all species of Phodopus and is active throughout the year. Campbell's dwarf hamsters are omnivores, and so feed on both plant and insect material. Campbell's dwarf hamster inhabits burrows with four to six horizontal and vertical tunnels in the steppes and semi deserts of central Asia, the Altai Mountains, autonomous areas of Tuva and the Hebei province in northeastern China.

This hamster is listed as of Least Concern by the International Union for Conservation of Nature (IUCN). It is native to China, Kazakhstan, Mongolia and the Russian Federation.

== Taxonomy and naming ==
The binomial name of Campbell's dwarf hamster is Phodopus campbelli. This species is the type species of Cricetiscus (named by Thomas in 1917, and now considered a synonym of Phodopus), and is named after C. W. Campbell, who first collected it on July 1, 1902, in Inner Mongolia. The type locality was the village Shaborte in Mongolia. This locality has puzzled later writers and was believed to be a general Mongolian word for a dry lake, and therefore with no specific coordinates. However, in the reprint of C. W. Campbell's book "Travels in Mongolia" it is clear that Shaborte is an actual village on the route followed through Mongolia. Thomas described the type specimen in 1905 as Cricetulus campbelli.

Synonyms for this species are Phodopus crepidatus and Phodopus tuvinicus. Common names have been applied to Campbell's dwarf hamster, including the striped hairy-footed hamster, the Djungarian hamster, the Siberian hamster, and Campbell's hamster. Campbell's dwarf hamster is commonly confused with the Djungarian hamster (Phodopus sungorus) due to some of the common names, such as the "Siberian hamster" also being used to describe the Djungarian hamster.

=== Subspecies ===
American biologist Ned Hollister described a subspecies in 1912:

- P. c. crepidatus : Found in the Altai Mountains of Siberia

== Description ==
The size of Campbell's dwarf hamster varies depending on its location. For example, eight wild specimens examined from Mongolia showed an average head and body length of 80 mm (3.1 in), an average hind foot length of 13.5 mm (0.53 in) long, with a tail length of 5 mm (0.20 in). In captivity, they are proportionally larger, as commercial pet food and fruits provide more nutrition than food found commonly in the wild. The lips and cheeks have white fur and the rest of the fur around the face can be either grey or brown. A dark and narrow dorsal stripe runs along the center of the back from the nape of the neck to about 2.5 cm (0.98 in) above the tail. The surface of the hands and feet are white to ensure the animal stays warm in colder climates in countries such as Mongolia.

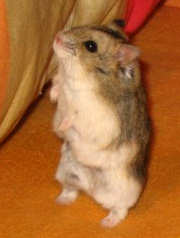
A Campbell's dwarf hamster

In both the wild and captivity, Campbell's dwarf hamsters scent-mark around their territories using Harderian glands, skin glands located behind the ears. They use urine and feces for communication.

Campbell's dwarf hamster is distinguished from the similar-looking Djungarian hamster by its smaller ears and no dark patch on the crown of its head, in certain colorations. The dorsal stripe of Campbell's dwarf hamster is narrower, shorter, and darker than that of the Djungarian hamster, and the fur on the stomach of Campbell's dwarf hamster is grey, but it is white on the Djungarian hamster. Campbell's dwarf hamster does not turn white in the winter and has a grey tint to its fur. It has a smaller interorbital breadth, but has a larger auditory bulla. Campbell's dwarf hamster is much less tolerant to lower temperatures than the Djungarian hamster. A laboratory experiment showed Campbell's dwarf hamster can resist temperatures as low as −31.8 °C (−25.2 °F), where the Djungarian hamster can withstand temperatures as low as −44.7 °C (−48.5 °F). Campbell's dwarf hamster reacts to lower temperatures by constantly exercising and tries to find a sheltered location, unlike the Djungarian hamster, which curls up and relies on its autonomic thermoregulation.

Campbell's dwarf hamster has cheek pouches, which are an extension of the mouth, extending from the mouth all the way to the rear legs. Food is transferred into these pouches through the diastema. The inside of the pouch contains a large number of folds of dermal papillae. When the pouch is full, it extends and becomes part of the structure of the skin. By 11 days of age, the cheek pouches are fully grown and can carry objects up to the size of a sunflower seed. When the cheek pouches become full, they extend back to the shoulder blades, which restrict movement.

Campbell's dwarf hamster is prone to genetic abnormalities in the metabolism of carbohydrates and lipids. They can develop tumours of the mammary glands, lungs, uterus, and ovaries. Tumours can also develop if the animal is exposed to chemical carcinogens. Due to having slow locomotion and an insignificant response to bright lights and humans, as well as having a low population density, field studies allow scientists to study entire populations in the wild.

=== Lifespan ===
Hamsters kept in captivity live for around 2.0–2.5 years. Young hamsters provided widely varied diets early in life are less likely to suffer digestive problems as they mature, but this is not always possible in the wild due to lack of food; this causes the life expectancy of captive hamsters to be greater than that of wild hamsters.

== Diet ==
As omnivores, Campbell's dwarf hamsters eat a variety of different foods. A balanced diet for a hamster consists of 16-24% protein, 60-65% carbohydrates, and 5–7% fat, with constant access to fresh water. In their natural habitats, dwarf hamsters feed almost exclusively on plant materials. In captivity, Campbell's dwarf hamsters can get the required nutrition from commercially available food designed specifically for hamsters, which typically contain a mix of dry grains, nuts, and seeds that may be fortified with vitamins and minerals. An excess of any one particular seed or nut can lead to digestive problems, obesity, and forms nutritional deficiency.

In addition to a commercially prepared seed mix, a balanced diet for a Campbell's dwarf hamster in captivity includes a regulated variety of fresh vegetables and fruits. Dark greens such as kale are rich in vitamins and minerals. Wild vegetables such as yarrow, chickweed, and dandelion and raspberry leaves, are also good sources of protein that help prevent obesity.

A hamster in captivity can occasionally eat mealworms or earthworms, which have high protein contents for them. Boiled egg whites and small pieces of clean, cooked chicken are also sources of extra protein. They can also eat wheat grain, sunflower seeds, and locusts. The teeth of Campbell's dwarf hamster never stop growing. Like all rodents, they must therefore gnaw regularly to keep their incisors from growing into the skin of the mouth and causing pain and irritation. Smooth, young wood from nontoxic trees, such as apple and willow, is readily used by most species in the genus. Most pet stores sell nontoxic wooden chews designed for rodents in captivity.

Certain food items commonly consumed by humans are toxic to hamsters and should be avoided completely in captivity. Chocolate and other sticky foods such peanut butter may solidify in a hamster's cheek pouches and lead to infections, which can lead to death.

In the wild, the diets of Campbell's dwarf hamsters vary across the population range. A total of 51 different species of plants were identified to be consumed by the Transbaikalia population, the most common being Stipa capillata and species of Allium. However, in Tuva, only 10 species of plant were identified to be consumed by the population, the most common being Potentilla. Campbell's dwarf hamster is a natural predator of burrowing worms and grubs.

== Breeding ==
In Tuva, the breeding season of Campbell's dwarf hamster begins in April, and in Mongolia, it begins in at the end of April or the beginning of May. However, in all distribution ranges, it ends in late September or early October. In captivity, Campbell's dwarf hamsters breed throughout the year, with no fixed breeding season, but a large number are born in the summer months. In the wild, three to four litters are produced each year, with an average of eight offspring per litter. In captivity, females can have between one and 18 litters per year, with one to nine offspring per litter. In captivity, the gestation period for Campbell's dwarf hamster is between 18 and 20 days, and the shortest gestation period recorded for a captive female was 13 days. The male hamster is likely to assist the female during birth. The male may pull the offspring from the birth canal, clean them, or collect food for the mother and offspring.

When the offspring are born, they are hairless and have a body mass of approximately 1.5 g (0.053 oz). Incisors and claws are already formed, but the digits, eyes, and pinnae are closed and cannot be used. The rate at which the young develop differs depending on the distribution range. However, the differences are usually no longer than a day. In Tuva, the pinnae open on the first day of birth and are completely open after three days of development. However, in Mongolia, the same process occurs between two and four days of development. Fur first grows on the crown, back, and abdomen. The young usually have a full coat of fur after seven days of development. Offspring born in captivity have a shorter development time than those born in the wild. Specifically, the growth and development of the head and body, tail, hind feet, and pinnae can be up to a day sooner than those found in the wild. After 28 days of development in captivity, the young are already around half the mass of their parents.

In captivity, females become sexually mature at two months of age. The ovarian follicle forms about 16 days prior to the birth of the offspring. After mating, female hamsters typically have larger uteri, ovaries, and adrenal glands compared to females which live alone, with other females or those that have not mated. The females and males may fight each other when getting to know their partner. Also, these females have a shorter gestation period, around four to five days.

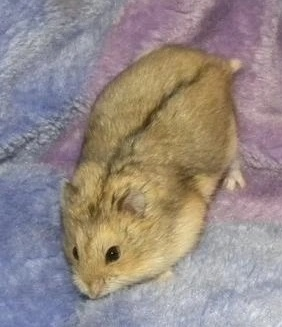
Agouti (wild) colouration

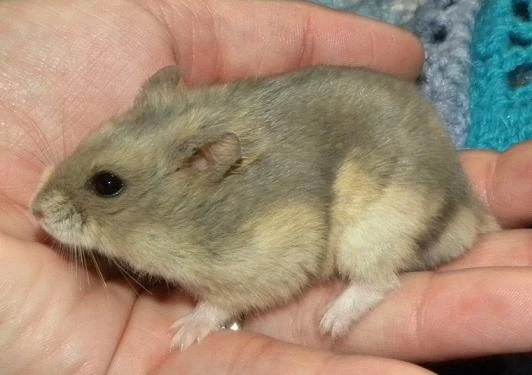
Opal colouration

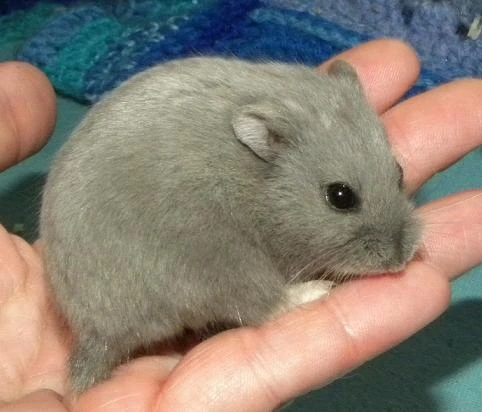
Blue colouration

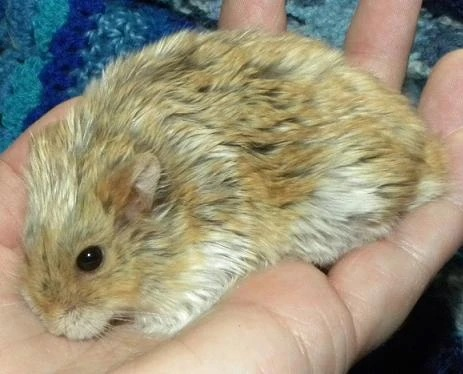
Argente satin colouration

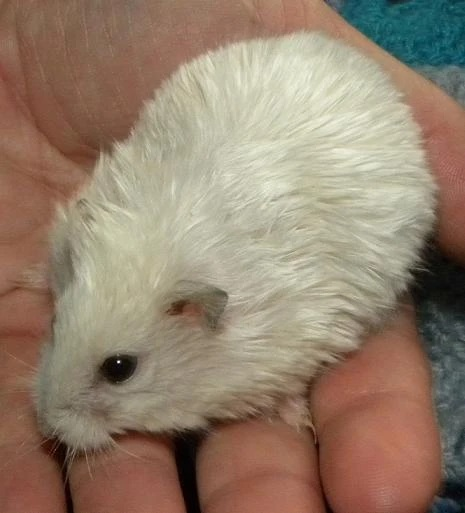
White satin colouration

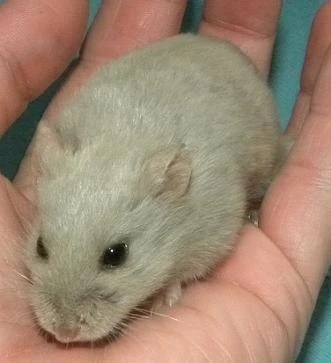
Lilac colouration

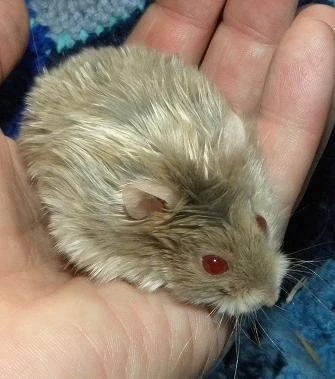
Blue fawn colouration

=== Hybrids ===
In captivity, only Campbell's dwarf hamsters and P.sungorus hamsters are able to interbreed and produce live offspring or hybrids. Although hybrids make suitable pets, the breeding of hybrids and cloning can cause health problems, due to inherited diseases. Because genetic information can be very similar, genetic health problems or vulnerabilities can easily be inherited by the offspring. The widespread breeding and distribution of hybrids could threaten the existence of both pure species and subspecies of the ecosystem. This could ultimately lead to the extinction of the subspecies. Each litter becomes smaller as more generations are produced and the young commonly begin to inherit many congenital problems.

P. sungorus and P. campbelli have the same number of chromosomes, and the chromosomes are similar in terms of size and morphology. However, several chromosomes show structural differences in the location and size of C-heterochromatin blocks. In nature, the two species do not meet, but will mate and produce offspring in captivity. However, both reciprocal crosses produce sterile hybrid males and females with decreased fertility. There is a clear effect in which types the parents are. The cross P. sungorus male x P. campbelli female will have embryos that grow normally, like both parent species. But the cross between P. campbelli male x P. sungorus female result in overgrowth, leading to embryonic death.

== Distribution and habitat ==
Campbell's dwarf hamsters inhabit burrows in the steppes and semideserts of central Asia, the Altai Mountains, autonomous areas of Tuva, and the Hebei province in northeastern China. A burrow can contain four to six horizontal and vertical tunnels. The tunnels leading to the nesting area can be as deep as 1 m (3 ft 3 in) below the ground, but are usually 20–30 cm (7.9–11.8 in) deep. The burrows are lined with either dry grass or sheep's wool. They may sometimes share burrows with Daurian pikas, but only in the steppes and semideserts of northern Manchuria. In parts of Mongolia, the hamsters may also share burrows with species of Meriones to save them from digging their own. In Tuva, Campbell's dwarf hamsters have been found living with other hamsters, such as the Chinese striped hamster, the Roborovski hamster, and the long-tailed dwarf hamster. The diets of the three types of hamsters are different to avoid fighting over the same type of food, which is why they live together.

Campbell's dwarf hamsters may also live near areas of human civilization. In Mongolia, they may be found in yurts to keep warm during the winter, as they do not have thermoregulation like the Djungarian hamster. They have five main predators: the Eurasian eagle owl, the steppe eagle, the corsac fox, the common kestrel, and the saker falcon. All distribution areas have more females than males, because males are at higher risk from predators, as they cannot move as quickly.

== Status and conservation ==
This hamster is listed as of Least Concern by the International Union for Conservation of Nature (IUCN). The population and distribution size is large, and no major or widespread threats to the species are known. However, due to the increasing number of livestock in the areas of distribution, such as the steppes of central Asia, some burrows are at a small risk of being destroyed. In arid areas of distribution, the reduction in the number of water sources is also of minor concern status. These hamsters are conserved in protected areas.
