= Daurian pika =

- In Russia

Conservation status
- Least Concern (IUCN 3.1)

Scientific classification
- Kingdom: Animalia
- Phylum: Chordata
- Class: Mammalia
- Order: Lagomorpha
- Family: Ochotonidae
- Genus: Ochotona
- Species: O. dauurica

Binomial name
- Ochotona dauurica (Pallas, 1776)
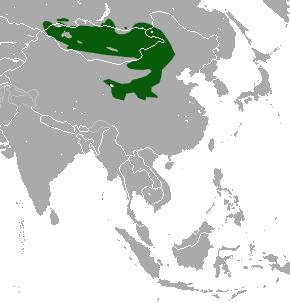
- Daurian pika range

Species of mammal

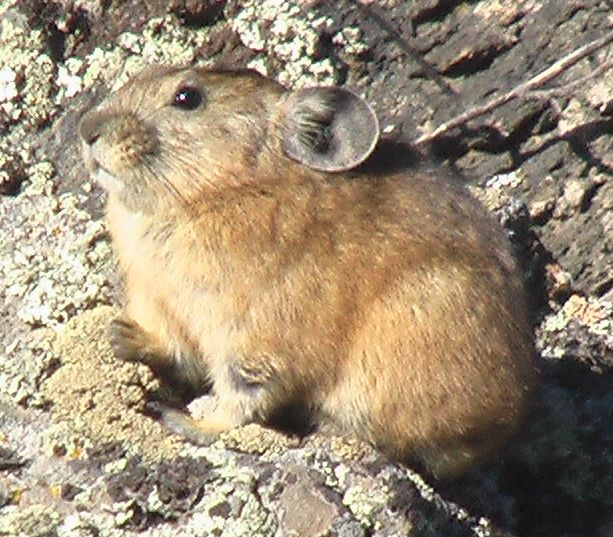
Daurian pika in Arkhangai Province, Mongolia

The Daurian pika (Ochotona dauurica) is a small relative of rabbits and hares in the order Lagomorpha. It is well known for its "barking" alarm call, and for its peculiar habit of making hay to help survive the winter. There are 4 recognized subspecies, Ochotona dauurica annectens, O.d. bedfordi, O.d. dauurica, and O.d. mursavi. Daurian pikas, like other lagomorphs, are characterized by a secondary set of incisor teeth. They are sexually monomorphic, with thick reddish coats. Pikas have no external tail, and their ears are large and rounded. The auditory bullae, a feature of the skull of daurian pikas are small in comparison to many other pikas. This is thought to be related to their fairly low altitude habitat preference. They are considered keystone species within their habitat.

== Taxonomy ==
Pikas first appeared in fossil records in the late Miocene, and were located in central Asia. Rivers and glaciers divided the region they first inhabited, allowing them to diversify into the 30 species known today. They are eutherian mammals in the order Lagomorpha. Lagomorpha is divided into 2 extant families, Leporidae which includes rabbits and hares, and Ochotonidae, the pikas. Although there is only one genus, Ochotona, there are 3 subgenera: Pika, Ochotona, of which Daurian pikas are members, and Conothoa. Daurian pikas can be distinguished from other pikas by range, social and feeding behaviors, and their reddish coat.

== Range and habitat ==
Daurian pikas are found throughout Mongolia, southern Russia, Manchuria and in several provinces of China. They live in mountainous regions, and are found at altitudes ranging from 400-4,000 meters above sea level. They are found in desert grasslands, where they are able to burrow in winter and find fresh grass to eat and herbaceous vegetation to store for winter. They sometimes share burrows with Campbell's dwarf hamster, but only in the steppes and semi deserts of northern Manchuria.

== Biology ==
Daurian pikas are diurnal, generalized herbivores. Their primary mode of locomotion is ambulatory, although as burrowers they are also semi-fossorial. They differ from many other pika species by forming communal winter haypiles. During summer they graze on monocot grasses. In late summer and early autumn they begin collecting herbaceous plants known as "forbs", which are high in lipids and proteins. These forbs are stored aboveground near communal burrows, where they dry into hay for utilization throughout the winter months. Around 10 piles are built for each burrow system. These haypiles are incredibly important to pika survival. It is estimated that only 1/3 of pikas survive each winter, assuming an adequate resource stockpile. If these piles are removed, survival drops to around 1/20. This causes the population to undergo huge annual population cycles, as they must have quite high fecundity to make up for the winter fatalities. They are capable of producing several litters per year, and may have up to 11 offspring in a single litter. Although lifespan has not been fully studied, it is known that pikas born early in the year may become reproductively active before the end of summer. Daurian pika communities are spread quite thinly across their range. Density of inhabited burrows is around 0.3-0.5 per hectare.

== Ecology ==
Daurian pikas have been observed sharing burrows with several other mammal species. They occasionally "visit" burrows of altai marmots and Mongolian pikas. In turn, their burrows are visited by ground squirrels, and sometimes by burrowing birds. Due to low competition and predation rates, the limiting factor on Daurian pika populations is winter.

== Conservation ==
Daurian pikas have been historically seen as agricultural pests, as they are herbivores sharing feeding grounds with livestock. As such they were subjected to pest control methods by farmers. In recent years, however, it has been discovered that they actually have quite different food preferences from domesticated animals, and are therefore not actually pests. Actions have been taken to educate local farmers on this fact, and pika hunting is on the decline. It is listed on the IUCN red list as a species of least concern, although there are some subpopulations around the Gobi desert that may be vulnerable.

== See also ==
- Communal burrow
