= Small mammals as pets =

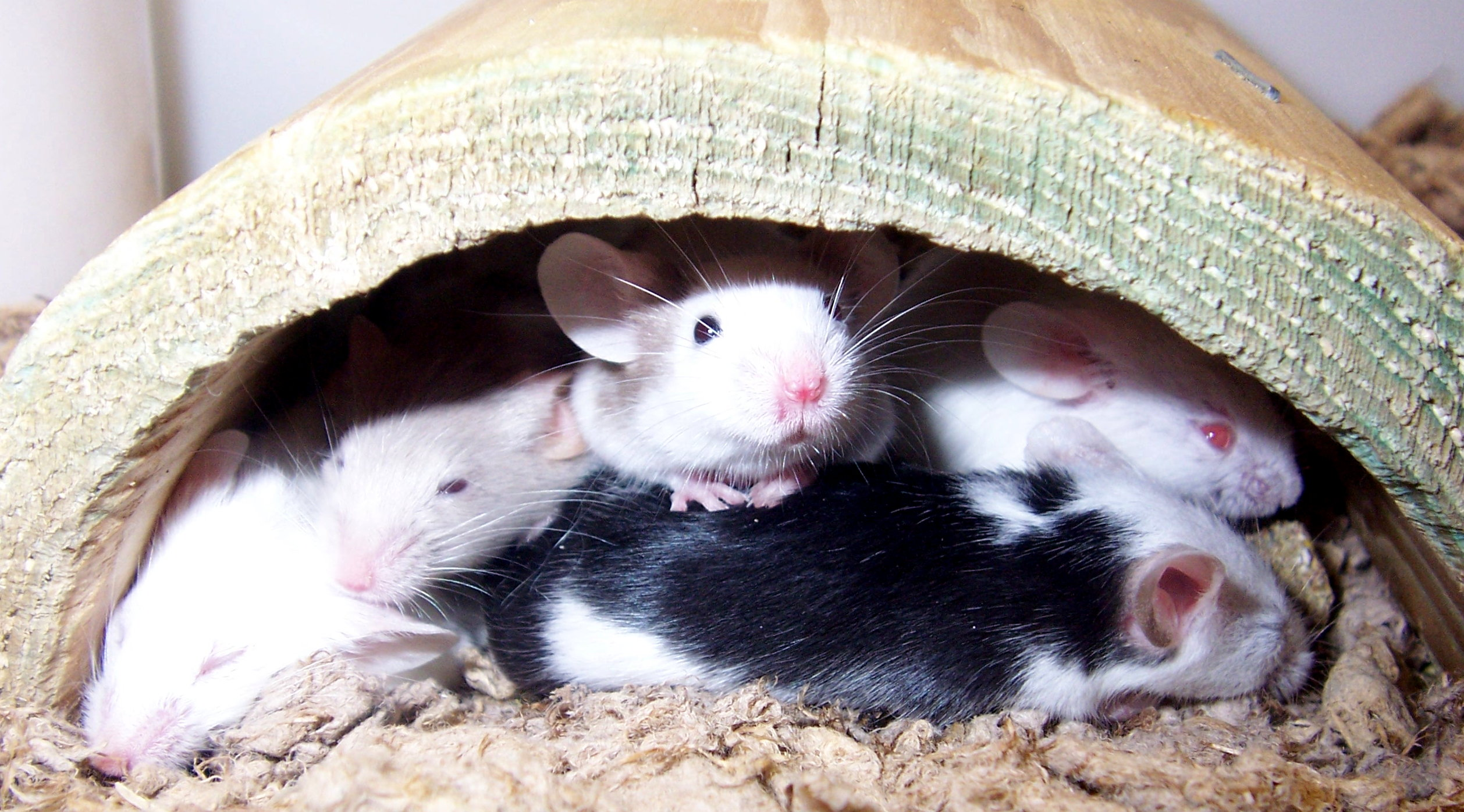
Pet mice enjoy company and a hiding place.

The domestication of small mammals to keep as pets is a relatively recent development, arising only after large-scale industrialization. Historically, Western society was more agrarian than today, with rodents as a whole seen as vermin that were carriers for disease and a threat to crops. Animals that hunted such pests, such as terriers, ferrets and cats, were prized.

Many small animals kept as household pets are rodents, including: fancy mice, fancy rats, hamsters (golden hamsters and dwarf hamsters), gerbils (Mongolian jirds and duprasi gerbils), common degus, common chinchillas, and guinea pigs (cavies). Non-rodents, including rabbits, hedgehogs and sugar gliders, are also kept.

Some of these small mammals are prohibited from being kept as pets in certain jurisdictions for being invasive; California, Hawaii, Alberta and New Zealand have strict regulations to protect their native environments and agricultural operations. Gerbils, degus, and domesticated rats have various prohibitions on their ownership.

== Nomenclature ==
The definition of a "small mammal" differs, but is generally accepted as all mammals weighing less than 5 kilograms (11 lb).

The term "pocket pet" is used for a small, pocket-sized mammal (sometimes also categorized as a "small and furry" in the pet industry) commonly kept as a household pet.

== Characteristics ==
Comparison of small pets
Species	Size (in grams)	Prohibitions	Tail	Circadian rhythm	Lifespan in years
Guinea pig	910	No	0 - No	Crepuscular (Active during twilight)	5-7
Mouse	35	No	3 - Long	Nocturnal/Crepuscular	2
Rat	450	One	3 - Long	Nocturnal	2
Hamster	160	No	1 - Very short	Nocturnal/Crepuscular	2
Hamster, dwarf	40	No	1 - Very short	Nocturnal/Crepuscular	2–3
Gerbil	90	Some	4 - Yes	Crepuscular	3
Degu	300	Yes	4 - Yes	Diurnal (Active during daytime)	6
Chinchilla	700	No	3 - Long	Crepuscular	10-20

=== Guinea pig ===
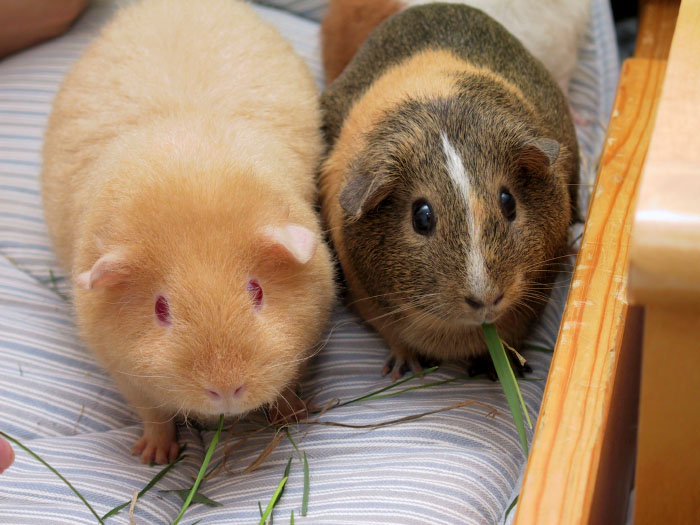
Guinea pigs

Guinea pigs (cavy) have perhaps been kept the longest as pets among rodents. While historically they were domesticated as a food staple for the native Inca people, they were imported to Europe as early as the mid-16th century, shortly after Spain conquered Peru. As an oddity from the New World, they were afforded a special status, and seen as house pets, rather than vermin or food. While their popularity was initially limited to the wealthy, their prodigious reproductive habits ensured that they spread throughout the middle classes shortly after their introduction; guinea pig burial places (not scattered bones—as would be found with an eaten animal) have been found in archaeological digs in early modern middle-class suburbs.

Guinea pigs do not store their food, and they therefore must eat all throughout the day. It is difficult for them to overeat since they require food moving through their digestive tract near constantly. They typically live in groups, or herds, scavenging for grass and other vegetation. As herbivores, guinea pigs cannot properly digest meat, instead requiring a diet of fibrous plant matter. They are crepuscular, meaning they are most active around dawn and dusk, a trait likely stemming from their wild ancestors' need to avoid predators. The modern guinea pig is entirely domestic and does not exist in the wild, though its evolutionary ancestors still do. As herd animals, guinea pigs typically do best in groups of two or more. They live off a diet consisting of grass hay and food pellets (without seeds or dried fruit), typically synthesized from timothy hay. Like humans, guinea pigs cannot synthesize their own vitamin C, making their food intake their only source of vitamin C. A lack of vitamin C will often cause fatal scurvy. At merely four weeks old, female guinea pigs become fertile and may produce as many as four to five litters a year. With an average gestation period of 59–72 days, a female guinea pig may become pregnant again in as few as 6 hours after giving birth. However, there are a lot of concerns related to guinea pig pregnancy. Guinea pigs tend to live between 4 and 5 years, with some guinea pigs living up to the age of 10.

=== Fancy mouse ===
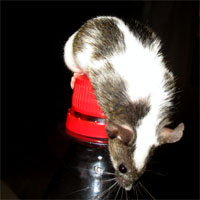
Young pet mouse

Fancy mice were popular pets in Japan during the 18th century, due in large part to the abundance of color mutations in wild mice. In 1787, a book on this hobby, The Breeding of Curious Varieties of the Mouse, was published by Chobei Zenya, a Kyoto money exchanger. Over time, the tradition spread from Japan to Europe, and in 1895 the National Mouse Club was established in England.

Fancy mice are nocturnal animals who utilize burrowing and hiding to evade predators due to their general defenselessness. Mice also utilize burrows to avoid light whenever possible. Mice live in families with developed social structure and territorial boundaries between families. Male mice organize themselves into a social hierarchy in which the most dominant mouse becomes the "lead buck", or the one at the top of the social ladder. Only the lead buck mates during mating season; all other mice are restricted by the lead buck or downright rejected by the female mice. Mice possess highly developed senses of smell, hearing, and feeling. However, their sense of sight is poor due to the odd location of their eyes on their head. Mice can hear pitches inaudible to the human ear and communicate with squeaks, some of which reach pitches humans cannot hear, detectable through the use of a microphone and oscilloscope.

Their sense of smell is highly developed and many mice can recognize if another mouse is part of their family groups based on smell alone. Their sense of touch is also highly developed; due to their poor eyesight a lot of movement is interpreted through the utilization of whiskers and guard hairs to orientate themselves and determine their surroundings. Female mice have a gestation period of 19 to 21 days and may have up to 15 litters a year, due to their ability to become pregnant again within 24 hours of giving birth. The average litter size is 10 to 12 pups who are born deaf and blind; within two weeks the litter will resemble small adult mice.

=== Fancy rat ===
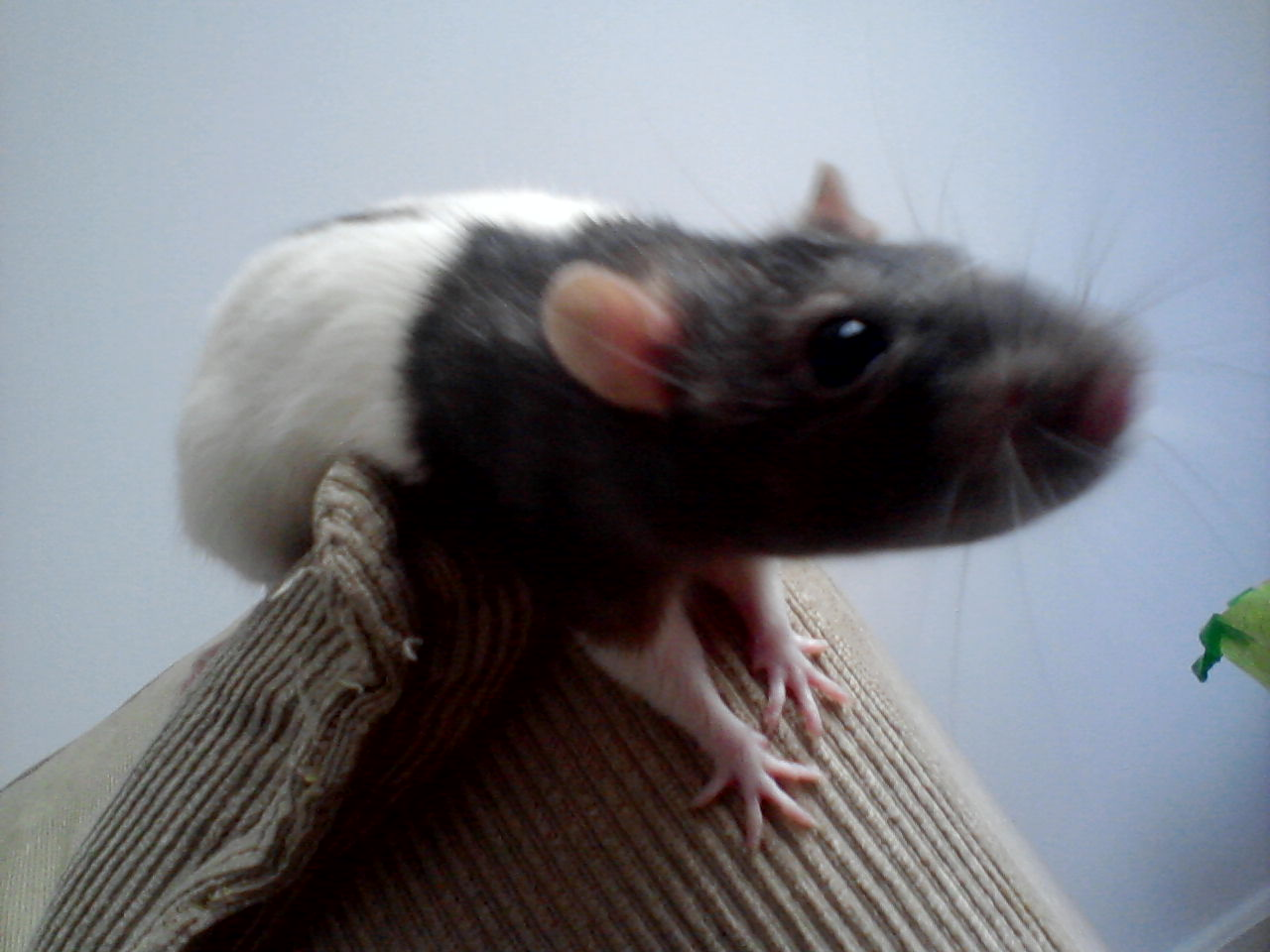
Domesticated rat

Fancy rats first became popular for blood sports in 19th-century England, but were later selectively bred from the brown rat as pets for unusual colouration. They are prohibited in Alberta, Canada, outside of schools, laboratories, and zoos. Fancy rats require the company of their own kind, especially when young; it is common to keep domestic rats paired together with companions of the same sex; rats housed with the opposite sex will breed rapidly. Whereas mice prefer independence, domestic rats enjoy the company of their owner. Female rats may become pregnant as early as five weeks old, producing a litter of about eight young each time, and are able to become pregnant again within 24 hours. Rats have sharp teeth that never stop growing, and will chew objects such as wood to shave down their teeth to an appropriate length. Wild brown rats have different diets depending on location. Rats are opportunistic eaters; in the wild, rats are omnivores, as they will scavenge for seeds, plants, fruits, insects and other small mammals. Due to a lack of easily accessible produce in the city, city rats will eat nearly anything, including trash and meat. Domestic rats live slightly longer than wild rats, with life spans of around two years.

=== Hamster ===
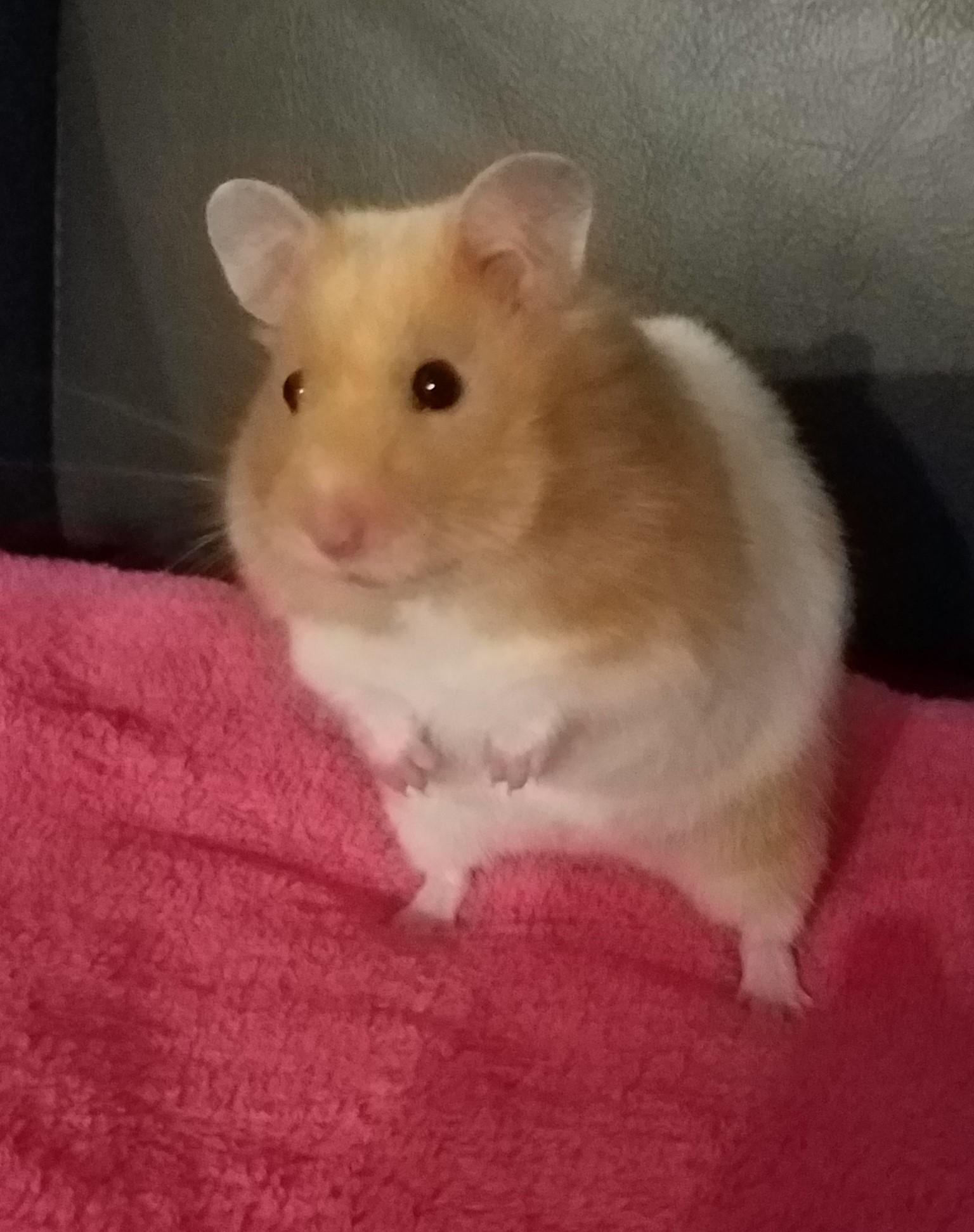
Syrian hamster

Hamsters first gained popularity as pets in the 1930s, with virtually all modern Syrian hamsters (the most common pet species) tracing their lineage back to a single litter of hamsters taken to Palestine for scientific research in 1930. Shortly thereafter, in 1938, hamsters were introduced to the United States. Dwarf hamsters are also popular pets. Wild hamsters are typically found in open areas such as deserts, plains, steppes, and fields. Hamsters scavenge for food, with a diet consisting primarily of grain and insects. Hamsters temporarily store their food in their large cheek pouches for transport to their burrows, where they maintain hoards. Territorial by nature, hamsters will react aggressively towards a member of their own species.

Domestic hamsters that are caged together will act aggressively towards one another as they get older, usually fatally. Syrian hamsters are strictly solitary, and while Roborovski dwarf hamsters can rarely be kept in pairs, this is strongly not advised. They typically are nocturnal or crepuscular, though they may be active during both night and day if their sleep schedule is disturbed. Hamsters produce two to four litters a year. Gestation takes 15 to 22 days and newborns only require nursing for approximately three weeks. The domestic hamster population is large; however, despite a rapid reproduction rate, wild hamster populations are diminishing due to habitat destruction and their place near the bottom of the food chain.

=== Gerbil ===
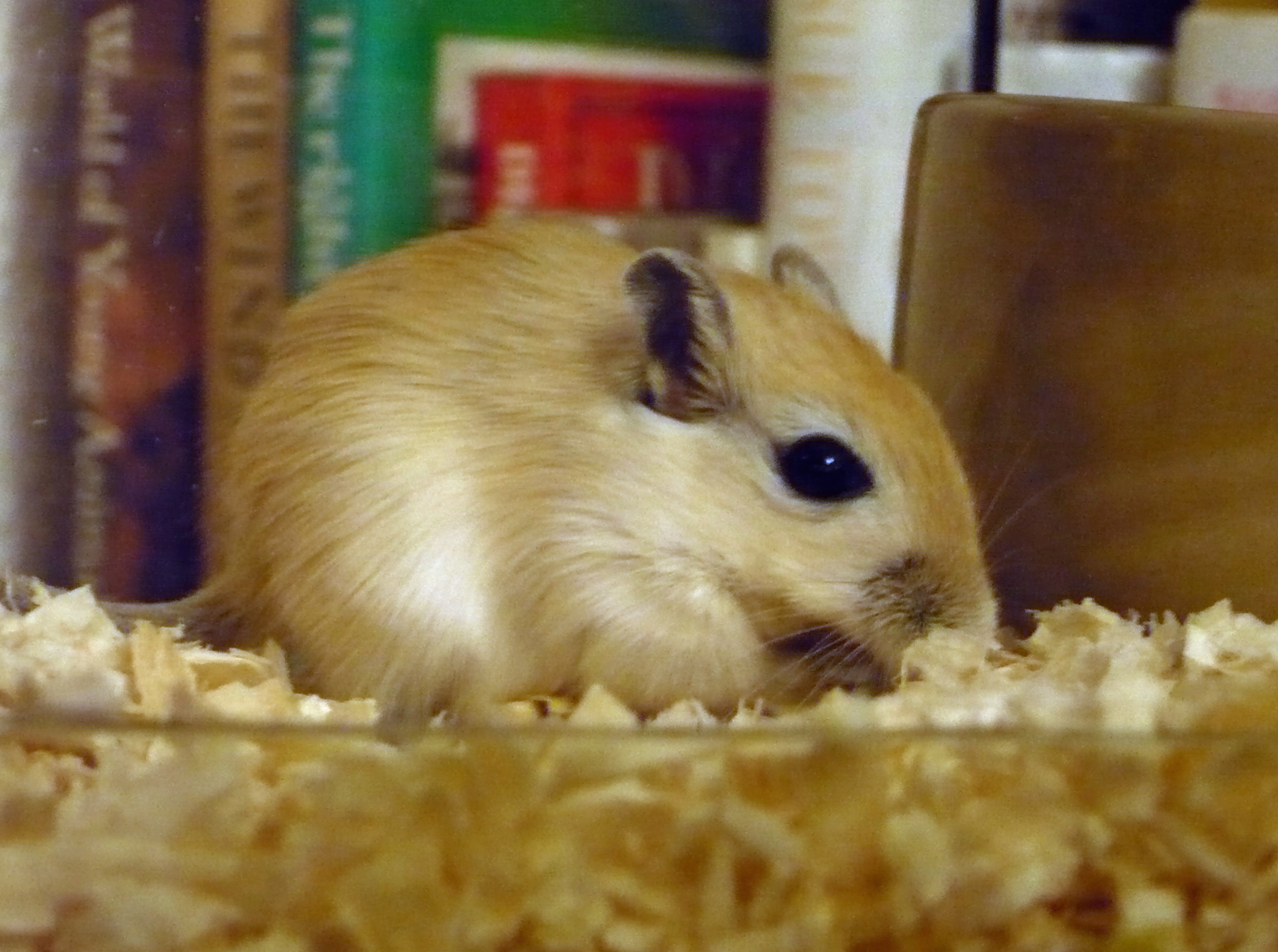
Young gerbil

Gerbils became established in the pet industry in 1964. They are prohibited in California. As desert dwellers, gerbils dig long burrows in order to escape the harsh temperatures. However, unlike hamsters, gerbils are not nocturnal. Gerbils are active most during the evening and morning, times in which the weather is calmest, making them primarily crepuscular. Gerbils are naturally curious, social, and nonviolent animals, making them more suitable for children than most pocket pets. Gerbils have an average lifespan of two to four years. Adult male gerbils are very territorial; typically the larger the gerbil, the larger their burrow and the more territory they scent mark. Gerbils communicate through the use of thumping their back legs and whistling sharply; thumping can be both a communication of excitement and anxiety.

=== Degu ===
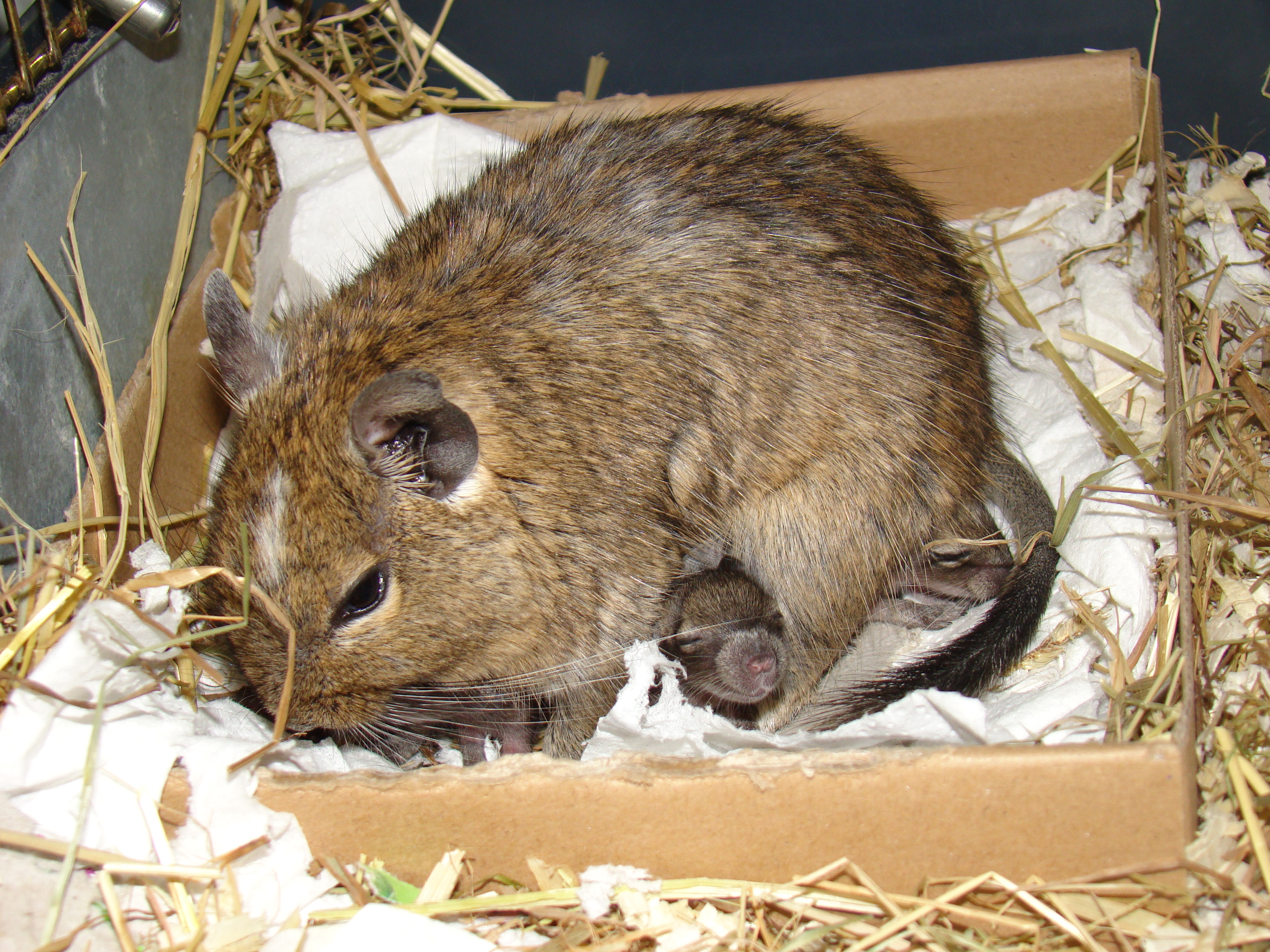
Male degu keeping his pups warm

After initial interest in common degus as research subjects, they have become popular as pets, though until recently they were seldom found in pet shops. Degus are social animals and thrive with a partner when kept as pets. Degus love to run around, exercise, and explore tight locations. Domestic degus require some form of bedding so that they may store their food similarly to wild degus. Degus' incisor and molar teeth never stop growing, so they need access to items to regularly chew on. They are naturally active during the day and rest during night, unlike most other pocket pets. They consume a diet heavy in fiber and require constant access to hay, and small amounts of pellets and leafy vegetables. They are prone to diabetes, so degus need a diet that is low in sugar and fat; fruits and vegetables high in sugar content such as carrots should not be provided. Degus occasionally eat their own droppings to obtain certain nutrients that keep their digestive system healthy. They are prohibited in California.

=== Chinchilla ===
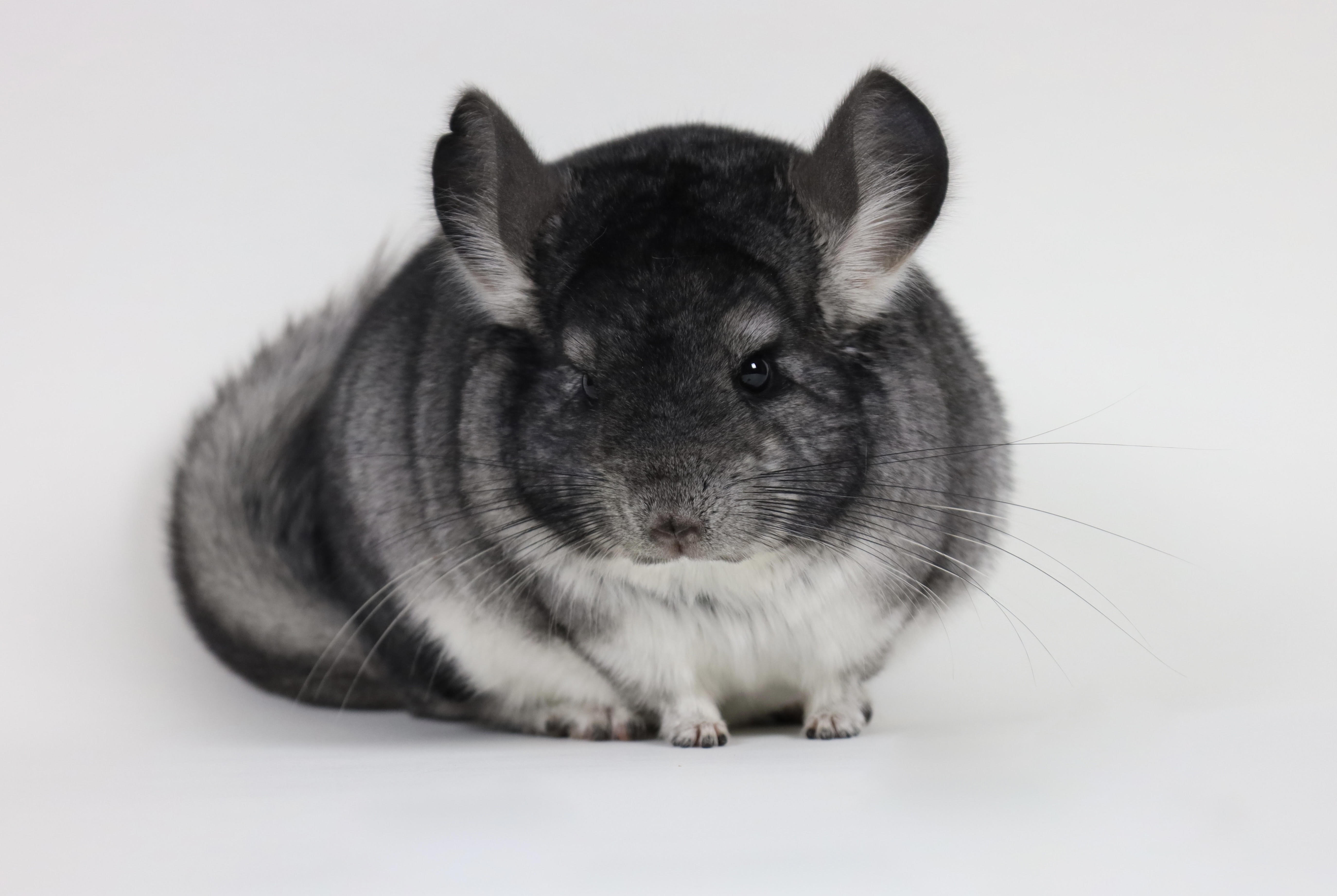
A standard gray Chinchilla

Chinchillas have been used in research since the 1950s. They are popular pets, but require much care. The domestic chinchilla is descended from Chinchilla lanigera, the long-tailed Chinchilla, and so have thinner bodies, longer tails and larger ears. Wild chinchillas roam in herds, so domestic chinchillas also like to have a companion and can live to be over 10 years old. They subsist on a diet of grass, hay, and grass-based chinchilla pellets. Their teeth never stop growing, so they rely on their food to wear down their teeth to the appropriate length. An improper diet can lead to serious dental disease. Chinchillas may eat small amounts of dried fruit and root vegetables as treats, but too much can lead to serious health issues such as obesity. They are typically nocturnal and require a lot of free space to roam around. They average two kits per litter and gestation lasts around 110 days. They can breed at 6–9 months of age. The females are seasonally polyestrous and come into heat every 30 to 90 days during the year. They can have up to three litters in a year if the female breeds soon after giving birth.

=== Ferret ===
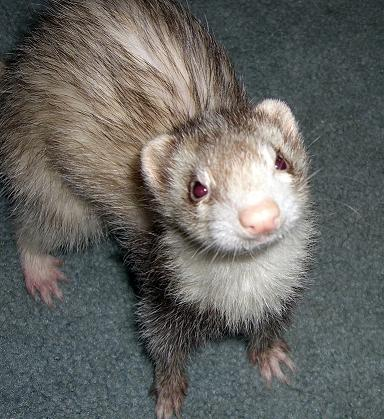
Female ferret

Ferrets have a high metabolic rate, meaning they can eat around 8 to 10 small meals daily. They are carnivorous, like cats, so they need a high protein intake which can be satisfied using pellets. Chicken and lamb are common ingredients in ferret food, it is best to avoid foods that include grain or corn. In the wild ferrets commonly take over the burrows of other small animals such as prairie dogs, domestic ferrets live in cages but should be let out for several hours each day. Domestic ferrets enjoy having many places to hide and explore such as tunnels and closed hammocks, some ferrets may also enjoy playing in water. As natural predators, ferrets should be kept separate from any prey animals. Like many other pocket pets, ferrets are social animals and thrive in groups of two or three. A ferret kept on its own will require a lot more attention from its owner than a ferret who has the constant company of his own species. Female ferrets reach sexual maturity at around 8 –12 months of age. A ferret gives birth to an average of 8 kits, gestation last about 41 days.

=== Sugar glider ===
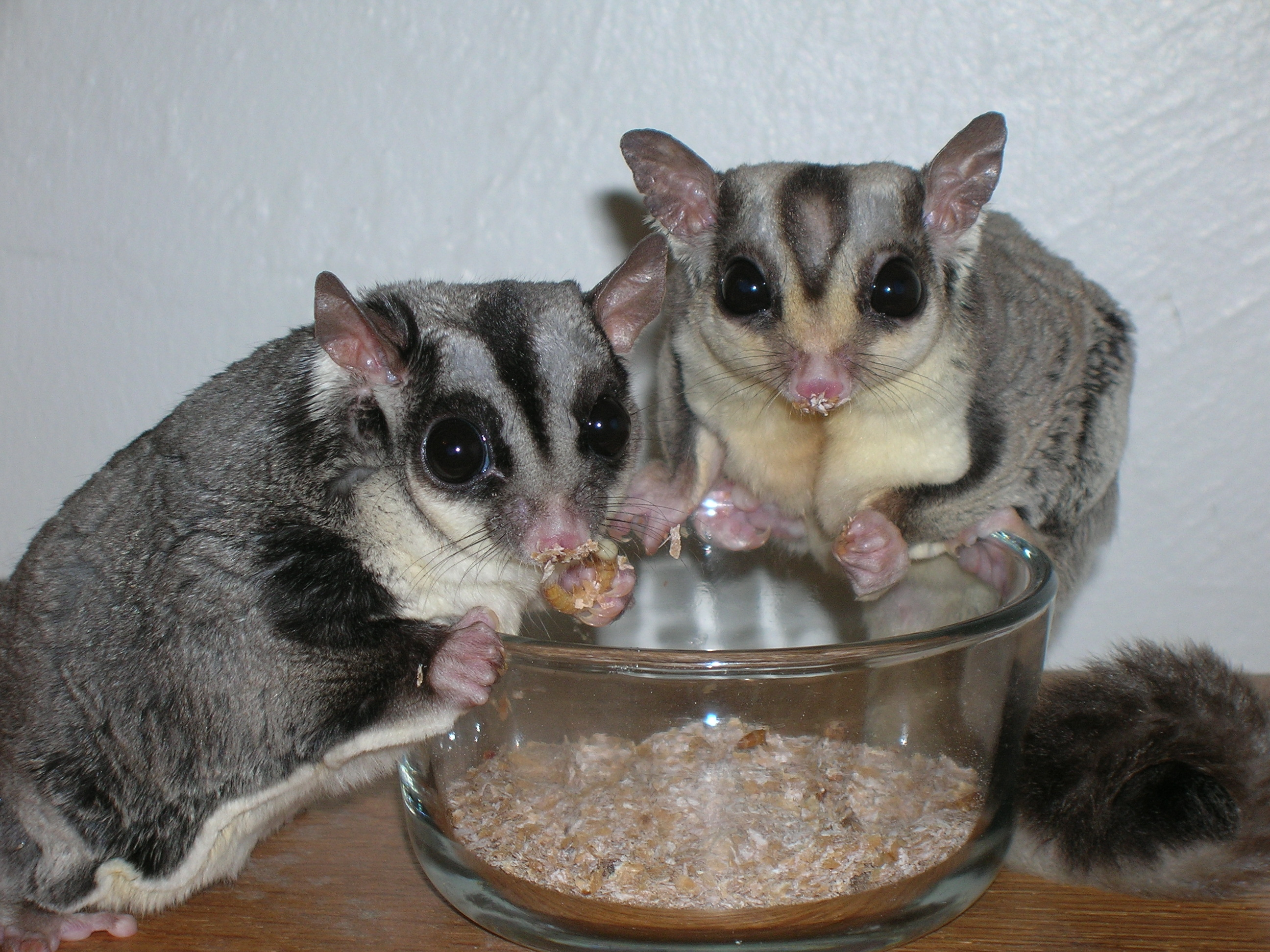
Sugar gliders eating mealworms

Around the world, the sugar glider is popular as an exotic pet, and is sometimes considered a pocket pet. Most US states and cities allow sugar gliders as pets, with some exceptions including California, Hawaii, Alaska, and New York City. In Australia, sugar gliders can be kept in Victoria, South Australia, and the Northern Territory. However, they are not allowed to be kept as pets in Western Australia, New South Wales, the Australian Capital Territory, Queensland or Tasmania.

Sugar gliders are social animals commonly living in groups of around 7 individuals. They communicate through vocalization and chemical odors and commonly live in trees. Male gliders become mature at 4–12 weeks and female gliders mature at 8–12 weeks. Breeding takes place in June to November and the glider gives birth to one child, or joey, although having twins is possible. The joey spends 2 months in the pouch only opening its eyes 80 days after birth. Male gliders do all the parental care and after 110 days the joey is ready to leave the nest. Sugar gliders are omnivorous relying on the consumption of insects in the summer. Gliders can also eat arthropods, sap, honeydew, and nectar from plants. Sugar gliders eat around 11 grams of food a day, 10 percent of their body weight.

=== Hedgehog ===
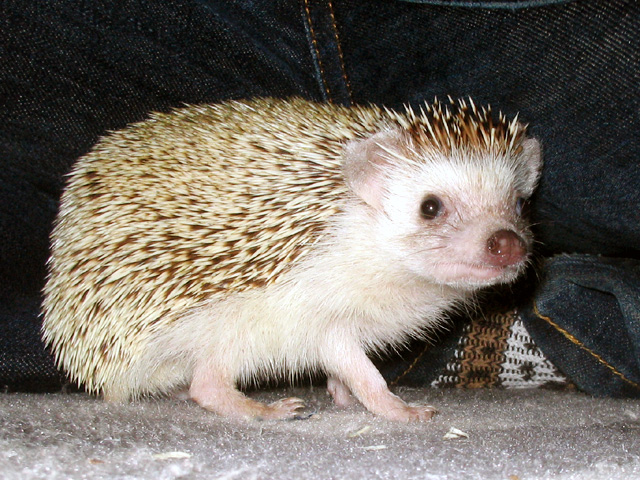
A pet hedgehog from Japan

Seventeen species of hedgehog exist worldwide. Hedgehogs are native in Europe, the Middle East, Africa, and central Asia. They were introduced to New Zealand by England and quickly became an invasive species. Hedgehogs are omnivorous and threaten insect, snail, lizard, and bird populations due to a lack of natural predators in New Zealand. Hedgehogs may tighten the orbicularis muscle on their back to hide their head, legs, and belly in a coat of prickly erect spines. Hedgehogs are primarily nocturnal, though some may be crepuscular. Hedgehogs typically take refuge in the empty burrow of another small animal, or a burrow they dug themselves. However, hedgehogs can occasionally take refuge under rocks or in thick vegetation, or anywhere dark and secluded. Hedgehogs tend to be solitary, though not to the extent of hamsters. Some captive bred females crave the companionship of another hedgehog and occasionally show bonding tendencies when housed with another female; male hedgehogs should not be housed together as they will fight once they reach sexual maturity.

Hedgehogs were classified under the order Insectivora prior to that classification's abandonment. Hedgehogs are considered omnivorous. Hedgehogs have been known to eat bugs, slugs, frogs, fish, worms, small mice, small snakes, and even fruits and vegetables. A hedgehog's diet should be very high in protein. Hedgehogs can eat fruits and vegetables but only in moderation. Despite their small size, hedgehogs require a large cage with bedding and plenty of furniture to hide in and explore. Hedgehogs have a gestation period of about 35 days, and give birth to, on average, 4 deaf and blind young (hoglets). At three to five weeks old the young leave the nest for the first time to go hunting on their own.

== See also ==
- Rats as pets
- Exotic pet
- Ferrets as pets
- Rabbits as pets
