= Muricidal test =

Behavioural test

The muricidal test is used in biological research. The name is derived from the Latin, for "killing of mice".

The test measures the propensity of rats to attack mice that are introduced to their home cage, or another environment. The laboratory application of this test does not necessarily involve the actual killing of the mouse. This test is sometimes used for antidepressant screening, the investigation of aggression, and in the investigation of other psychotropic agents. The test may be useful in identifying antidepressants as many antidepressants with serotonergic mechanisms inhibit muricidal behavior. Lithium has antidepressant properties, but does not inhibit muricidal behavior, which suggests a potential limitation against using it as an antidepressant screening test.
