= Lama dwarf hamster =

Conservation status
- Least Concern (IUCN 3.1)

Scientific classification
- Kingdom: Animalia
- Phylum: Chordata
- Class: Mammalia
- Infraclass: Placentalia
- Order: Rodentia
- Family: Cricetidae
- Subfamily: Cricetinae
- Genus: Cricetulus
- Species: C. lama

Binomial name
- Cricetulus lama Bonhote, 1905

Species of rodent

The Lama dwarf hamster (Cricetulus lama) is a species of hamster and rodent in the family Cricetidae. It is found only in the mountains of western China where it inhabits grassland, shrubby marshes and steppes. Although it has a limited range, the International Union for Conservation of Nature has assessed its conservation status as being of "least concern".

== Description ==
The Lama dwarf hamster has a head and body length of between 86 and 103 mm (3.4 and 4.1 in) and a tail length of 40 to 50 mm (1.6 to 2.0 in). The Lama dwarf hamster is very similar in appearance to the Chinese striped hamster (Cricetulus barabensis), but is rather smaller. It has a shorter tail and lacks the blackish markings on the dorsal fur and upper thighs that that species often has. The dorsal fur is dark greyish-brown, the underparts are greyish white and there is a sharp dividing line where the two colours meet. The tail is thick and well covered with guard hairs, having a dark stripe at the top and otherwise being white, with a wholly white tip.

== Distribution and habitat ==
The Lama dwarf hamster is endemic to western China where it is found in the Tibet Autonomous Region. It is a mountain species and is found at high altitudes. Its typical habitat is upland grasslands, shrubby marshes and open steppe.

== Behaviour ==
The behaviour of the Lama dwarf hamster has been little studied, but it is believed to be similar to that of the Chinese striped hamster, in fact some authorities consider the Lama dwarf hamster to be a subspecies of C. barabensis. It lives in a burrow, ventures out to forage for seeds, carries some back to the burrow to store in specially constructed chambers and breeds in the summer.

== Status ==
The Lama dwarf hamster has a limited range but is presumed to have a large total population. The population trend is unknown, but no particular threats have been identified and it may be present in some protected areas. The International Union for Conservation of Nature has therefore assessed the hamster's conservation status as being of "least concern".
