= Urocricetus =

Urocricetus Temporal range: Late Miocene to Recent

Scientific classification
- Kingdom: Animalia
- Phylum: Chordata
- Class: Mammalia
- Order: Rodentia
- Family: Cricetidae
- Subfamily: Cricetinae
- Genus: Urocricetus; Satunin, 1903

Type species
- Urocricetus kamensis Satunin, 1903

Species
- Urocricetus alticola (Thomas, 1917); Urocricetus kamensis Satunin, 1903

Genus of rodents

Urocricetus is a genus of hamsters found on the Tibetan Plateau in southern Asia. These species have relatively long tails for a hamster, with brownish upperparts and a pure white underside.

== Taxonomy ==
The genus Urocricetus was originally described by the Russian zoologist Konstantin Satunin as a subgenus of Cricetus. Urocricetus would be sometimes recognized as a subgenus of Cricetulus until 2018, when a phylogenetic study revealed this genus to be valid. This genus is a sister taxa to the desert hamster genus Phodopus.

As of 2024, two closely related species are recognized in this genus:

- Urocricetus alticola - Ladakh dwarf hamster, native to the western Nepal, northern India, and the Chinese autonomous region of Tibet
- Urocricetus kamensis - Kam dwarf hamster, native to the Chinese provinces of Gansu and Qinghai and the autonomous regions of Tibet and Xinjiang

The species Cricetulus lama and Cricetulus tibetanus are recognized as valid by the IUCN but considered a synonym of Urocricetus kamensis by the American Society of Mammalogists. Both of these possibly valid species live on the Tibetan Plateau, while the other valid Cricetulus species occur further north and northeast of the Tibetan Plateau. More research is needed for this genus at the species level.
