= Tibetan dwarf hamster =

Conservation status
- Least Concern (IUCN 3.1)

Scientific classification
- Kingdom: Animalia
- Phylum: Chordata
- Class: Mammalia
- Order: Rodentia
- Family: Cricetidae
- Subfamily: Cricetinae
- Genus: Urocricetus
- Species: U. alticola

Binomial name
- Urocricetus alticola (Thomas, 1917)

Species of rodent

The Tibetan dwarf hamster (Urocricetus alticola) is a species of rodent in the family Cricetidae. It is found not only in Tibet and China, but also in India and Nepal in mountainous regions at altitudes of up to about 5,200 m (17,100 ft). It was moved from the genus Cricetulus to Urocricetus in 2018.

== Description ==
The Tibetan dwarf hamster has a head and body length of about 103 mm (4.1 in) and a tail of between 30 and 37 mm (1.2 and 1.5 in). The head and neck are a pale sandy ochre color and the body is a slightly darker and uniform shade of ochre. The underparts and the upper surfaces of the feet are white. The ears are a darker shade of brown, contrasting with the body colour, and have pale rims at their tip and a small tuft of white hairs at their base. The tail is bicoloured, being dark on the upper surface and white below.

== Distribution and habitat ==
The Tibetan dwarf hamster is native to northern parts of southern Asia and parts of southwestern China. Its range includes Jammu and Kashmir and western Nepal at altitudes of up to about 4,000 m (13,100 ft), and in China it is found in southwestern Xinjiang and northwestern parts of the Tibet Autonomous Region, at altitudes of between 3,100 and 5,200 m (10,200 and 17,100 ft). It is likely that it is present at these sorts of altitudes in intervening locations along the Himalayan range. It occupies an assortment of different habitats including coniferous and birch forests, desert steppes, shrubland, swampy grassland and Alpine meadow.

== Behaviour ==
The behaviour of the Tibetan dwarf hamster is thought to be similar to that of the Kam dwarf hamster (Urocricetus kamensis) which is active both day and night. Some authorities think it is synonymous with T. kamensis, or a subspecies. It digs a simple burrow that may extend 50 cm (20 in) beneath the surface of the ground and which includes nesting areas and chambers to store food for use in winter. It forages for grain and seeds and also eats insects. Breeding takes place in the summer, litter size being usually between five and ten young.
