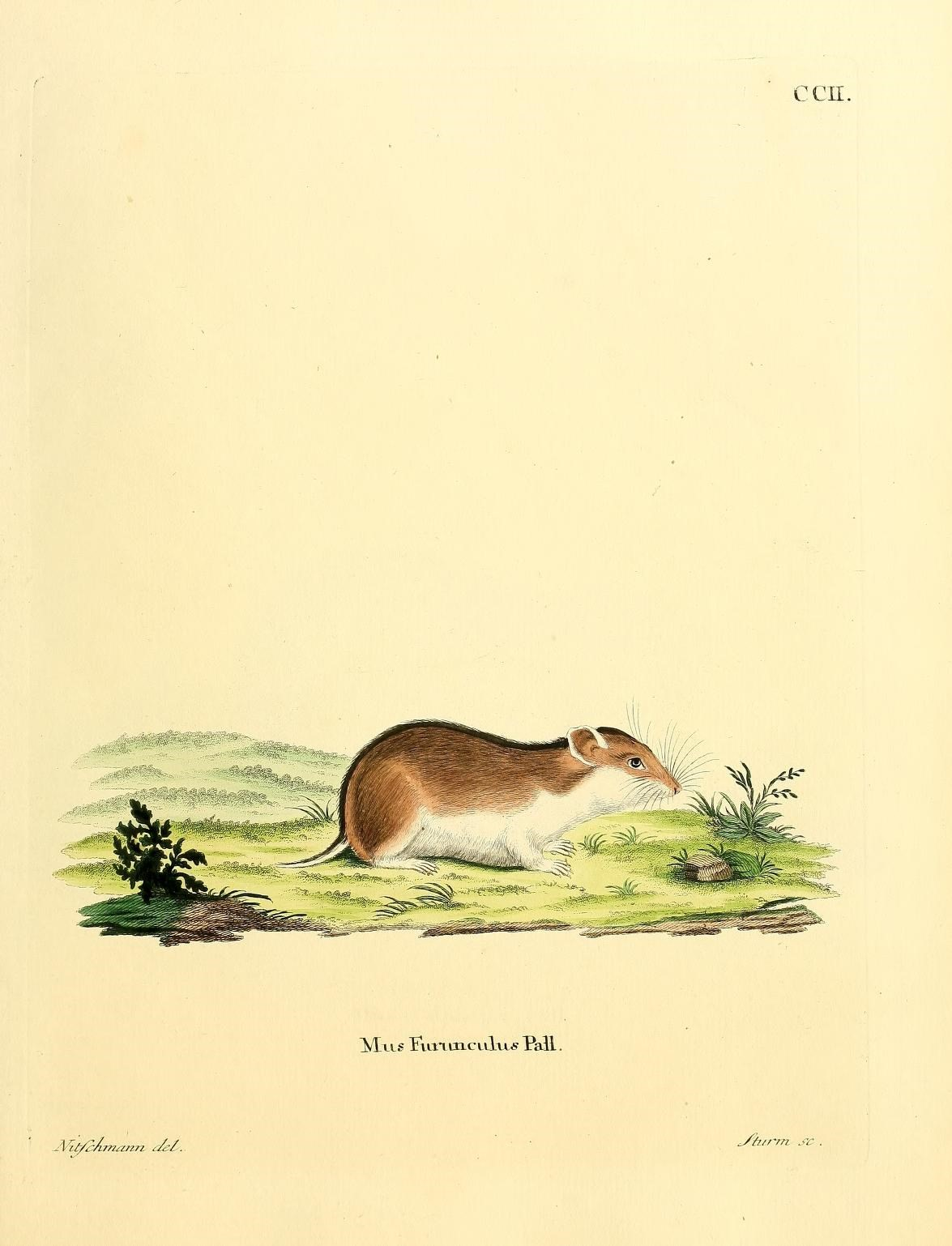

Conservation status
- Least Concern (IUCN 3.1)

Scientific classification
- Kingdom: Animalia
- Phylum: Chordata
- Class: Mammalia
- Infraclass: Placentalia
- Order: Rodentia
- Family: Cricetidae
- Subfamily: Cricetinae
- Genus: Cricetulus
- Species: C. barabensis

Binomial name
- Cricetulus barabensis (Pallas, 1773)

= Chinese striped hamster =

Species of rodent

The Chinese striped hamster (Cricetulus barabensis), also known as the striped dwarf hamster, is a species of hamster. It is distributed across North Asia from southern Siberia through Mongolia and northeastern China to northern North Korea. An adult Chinese striped hamster weighs 20 to 35 g (0.7 to 1.2 oz), and has a body length of 72 to 116 mm (2.8 to 4.6 in) with a tail of 15 to 26 mm (0.6 to 1.0 in). It is smaller and has a much shorter tail than the greater long-tailed hamster, Tscherskia triton, which inhabits much of the same range.

== Taxonomy ==
The Chinese striped hamster was first described in 1773 as Cricetulus barabensis by the German zoologist Peter Simon Pallas. There is some confusion over the Latin name of the Chinese striped hamster and the closely related Chinese hamster. Some people consider the Chinese hamster (Cricetulus griseus) and the Chinese striped hamster (Cricetulus barabensis) different species, whereas others classify them as identical, the Chinese striped hamster as a subspecies of the Chinese hamster (in which case the Latin name of the Chinese striped hamster would be Cricetulus griseus barabensis) or the other way round (in which case the Latin name of the Chinese hamster would be Cricetulus barabensis griseus).

Six subspecies are recognised; C. b. humatus is found in Heilongjiang, Jilin and Inner Mongolia; C. b. griseus is found in Liaoning, Inner Mongolia, Hebei, Beijing, Tianjin, Shandong, Henan and Shanxi; C. b. manchuricus is found in eastern Heilongjiang; C. b. obscurus is found in Inner Mongolia, Ningxia, eastern Gansu, northern Shaanxi and Shanxi; C. b. pseudogriseus; and C. b. xinganensis is found in northern Heilongjiang and northeastern Inner Mongolia.

== Description ==
The Chinese striped hamster has a head and body length of between 72 and 116 mm (2.8 and 4.6 in) and a tail length of 15 to 26 mm (0.6 to 1.0 in) and a weight of 20 to 35 g (0.7 to 1.2 oz). The snout is short, the eyes set wide apart and the ears are neat and rounded, blackish fringed with white. The dorsal surface is pale greyish-brown with a faint blackish dorsal stripe running along the spine. The underparts are grey, the hairs having white tips. The tail is about thirty percent of the combined length of the head and body.

== Distribution and habitat ==
The Chinese striped hamster is native to central and eastern Asia. Its range includes Western Siberia, Tuva, the Trans-Baikal region, Mongolia, northeastern China, Primorsky Krai and Korea. Its typical habitat is arid and semiarid grasslands, steppe and semi-desert. It also occupies farmland and sometimes moves into buildings.

== Behaviour ==
The Chinese striped hamster digs a burrow in which several individuals live. This is up to a metre long and up to half a metre below the surface of the ground. There are usually several entrances about 2.5 cm (1 in) in diameter and side passages ending in storage chambers or nesting chambers. This hamster is most active in the early hours of the night when it emerges from its burrow to forage for seeds of grains and legumes. It carries food in its cheek pouches and excess food is stored in the burrow. It hibernates during the winter, emerging in February or March.

Reproductive activity takes place through spring, summer and autumn, and there may be as many as five litters in this period. Breeding peaks in March and April, and there is another peak in autumn. The average litter size is six or seven, but up to ten offspring have been recorded.

== Status ==
The Chinese striped hamster has a wide range and a large total population. It has been recorded from some protected areas and is a common species. The population trend is unknown, but no particular threats have been identified other than loss of habitat through overgrazing or wildfires, and the International Union for Conservation of Nature has assessed the hamster's conservation status as being of "least concern".
