= Long-tailed dwarf hamster =

Conservation status
- Least Concern (IUCN 3.1)

Scientific classification
- Kingdom: Animalia
- Phylum: Chordata
- Class: Mammalia
- Infraclass: Placentalia
- Order: Rodentia
- Family: Cricetidae
- Subfamily: Cricetinae
- Genus: Cricetulus
- Species: C. longicaudatus

Binomial name
- Cricetulus longicaudatus (A. Milne-Edwards, 1867)

Species of rodent

The long-tailed dwarf hamster (Cricetulus longicaudatus) is a species of rodent in the family Cricetidae. It is found in China, Kazakhstan, Mongolia, and Russia.

== Description ==
The long-tailed dwarf hamster has a head and body length of between 85 and 135 mm (3.35 and 5.31 in) and a tail at least a third as long as this. It weighs between 15 and 50 g (0.53 and 1.76 oz). The dorsal pelage is either a pale sandy brown or a dark greyish brown. The ventral surface is greyish white, individual hairs having dark bases, greyish shafts and white tips. There is a sharp dividing line at the side of the body separating the dorsal and ventral colourings. The ears are dark with pale rims and the upper surfaces of the feet are white. The tail is slender, being dark on the upper surface and white below.

== Distribution ==
This hamster is native to northern and central China, western and central Mongolia, Kazakhstan, Tuva and the Transbaikal region of Russia. Its easternmost extent in Mongolia is at a longitude of about 104° E and it has been found to be present in the Ikh Nartiin Chuluu Nature Reserve in the East Gobi Province of Mongolia. It inhabits arid areas with shrubby slopes, dry forests, rocky steppes, and the foothills and southern slopes of mountains, to an altitude of about 1,900 m (6,200 ft). It is especially abundant in piedmont semidesert, a type of desert grassland with mixed shrubs and succulent plants, or savannah with scattered xeromorphic trees.

== Behaviour ==
The activity cycle is nocturnal. The species feeds on seeds and insects. It constructs shallow tunnels and burrows under boulders, creating storage chambers where excess food is stored for winter use. Abandoned burrows of other animals are sometimes used and side-passages are created leading to grass-lined nesting chambers. Breeding starts in March or April and two or more litters of up to nine young are born during the summer.

== Status ==
C. longicaudatus has a wide range and a large total population. Although its habitat may be increasingly affected by drought in years to come, and there may be increased pressure on the habitat from grazing by livestock, these are unlikely to have a significant adverse effect and no particular threats to this species have been identified. The International Union for Conservation of Nature has therefore assessed the hamster's conservation status as being of "least concern".
