= Kam dwarf hamster =

Conservation status
- Least Concern (IUCN 3.1)

Scientific classification
- Kingdom: Animalia
- Phylum: Chordata
- Class: Mammalia
- Order: Rodentia
- Family: Cricetidae
- Subfamily: Cricetinae
- Genus: Urocricetus
- Species: U. kamensis

Binomial name
- Urocricetus kamensis Satunin, 1903

Species of rodent

The Kam dwarf hamster (Urocricetus kamensis) is a species of rodent in the family Cricetidae. It is found only in the mountains of western China where it inhabits grassland, shrubby marshes and steppes. Although it has a limited range, the International Union for Conservation of Nature has assessed its conservation status as being of "least concern". It was recently moved from the genus Cricetulus to Urocricetus.

== Description ==
The Kam dwarf hamster has a head and body length of between 88 and 112 mm (3.5 and 4.4 in) and a tail length of 51 to 64 mm (2.0 to 2.5 in). The dorsal fur is dark greyish-brown, sometimes spotted or streaked with black, the underparts are greyish white and there is a wave-like transition where the two colours meet. The tail is thick and well-covered with guard hairs, having a dark stripe at the top and otherwise being white, with a wholly white tip.

== Distribution and habitat ==
The Kam dwarf hamster is endemic to western China where it is found in the Tibet Autonomous Region and the provinces of Qinghai, Gansu and Xinjiang. It is a mountain species and is found at altitudes of between 3,300 and 4,100 m (10,800 and 13,500 ft). Its typical habitat is upland grasslands, shrubby marshes and open steppe.

== Behaviour ==
The Kam dwarf hamster is active by both day and night. It digs a simple burrow that may extend 50 cm (20 in) beneath the surface and which includes nesting areas and chambers to store food for use in winter. It forages for grain and seeds and also eats insects. Breeding takes place between May and August, peaking between June and July. Litter size is usually seven or eight, but ranges from five to ten.

== Status ==
The Kam dwarf hamster has a limited range but is thought to have a large total population. The population trend is unknown, but no particular threats have been identified and it may be present in some protected areas. The International Union for Conservation of Nature has therefore assessed the hamster's conservation status as being of "least concern".
