= Hamster cage =

Enclosure that houses hamsters

A hamster cage is an enclosure designed to house one hamster. It is recommended that the minimum size for a hamster cage is at least 110 cm x 50 cm x 50 cm tall for Syrian Hamsters and 100 cm x 50 cm x 50 cm tall for dwarf species of hamsters (approximately 775 square inches of floor space).. There is evidence that hamsters experience less stress if housed in larger cages. Commercially available enclosures are made of wire/metal bars with a plastic base, and also some made of metal and perspex. Some pet owners house their hamsters in aquarium tanks, and some make their own enclosures out of engineered wood and mesh or plexi. Laboratory hamsters, commonly known as laboratory Syrian hamsters, are housed in pens designed for scientific use. There are also special pens designed for hamster shows.

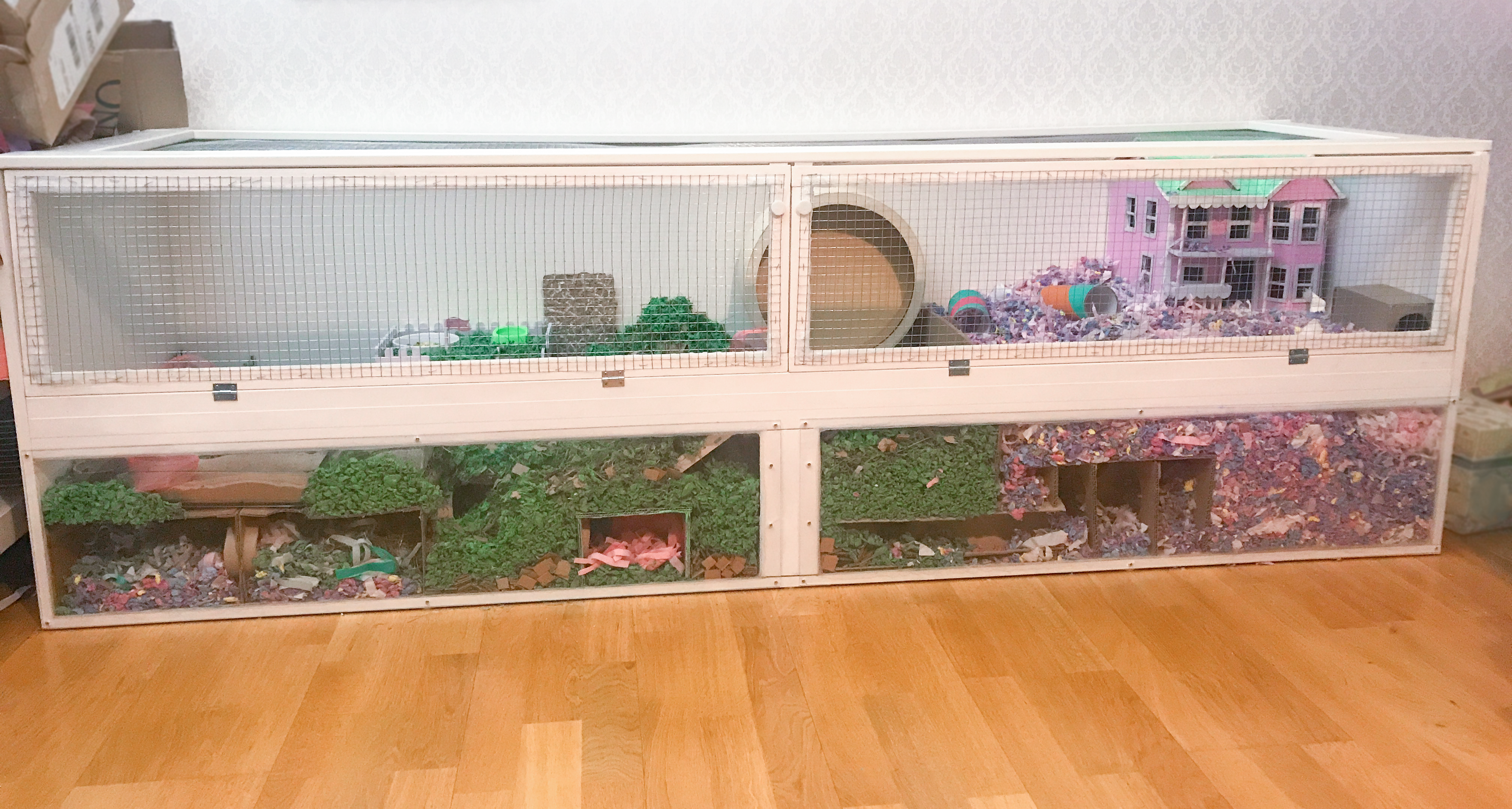
Home-built enclosure for a Syrian hamster that measures 200x60x60cm (1860 sq in)

== Hamster cage specifications ==
=== Cage size ===
The recommended cage size for a hamster is a minimum of 100 cm long by 50cm deep by 50cm tall for Syrian Hamsters and 40cm tall for dwarf hamsters.

=== Flooring and bedding ===
The ideal floor for a hamster is solid and covered with bedding. Safe bedding options include aspen shavings and unscented commercial paper pulp bedding marketed specifically for small animals, as well as spruce shavings and hemp shaving (All of these unscented). It's also recommended to use a bedding capable of holding burrows, as hamsters would do that in the wild. Hamsters whose cages have thick bedding experience greater health, so experts recommend aiming for 15cm (6 inches) or preferably more. Wire flooring can harm hamster paws, causing bumblefoot, so floors are typically covered with solid materials such as cardboard, ceramic, or specially designated mats. Wire cages that permit hamsters to throw bedding material through the wires as they burrow, dig, and play are common. Alternatively, pens with solid walls that contain all the bedding and prevent drafts of air from disturbing the hamster may also be used.Hamsters should have no fewer than 8 inches of bedding, although 12 or more inches of bedding is preferred.

=== Wire-top cages ===
A wire-top cage is a plastic base with an overarching wire structure. Some wire-top cages come in varying shapes and sizes, and may contain one or more levels with tubes, stairs, and ladders connecting the levels. A wire cage with wired stairs may cause bumblefoot. Wire-top cages for hamsters are often marketed in two varieties: one version for larger Syrian hamsters, with approximately 12 mm (0.47 in) of space between the bars, and another version for Chinese or dwarf hamsters, with approximately 8 mm (0.31 in) of space between bars. Pens with smaller gaps are usually intended for mice, and are likely to be too small to provide adequate space for any species of hamster, although they may be used as temporary transport cages.

Use of wire-top cages with external tubes is not recommended, as these can be an escape-route and confuse a hamster's natural instincts to burrow. The base is generally not deep enough to hold more than 6 inches of bedding, but these cages can be adapted by adding cardboard or plexi inside the bars to achieve more bedding depth. There are varying opinions on wire/barred cages. Some prefer them for good ventilation and closer interaction with the hamster. However it is important they are not too tall or there could be fall risks from a height. Hamsters are likely to chew bars if the cage is not large enough. Bar spacing should be no larger than 1cm. Narrower bar spacing for roborovski and dwarf hamsters is needed, or solid-sided tank style cage. There are now some very large wired top cages available in the UK and Europe up to 120cm x 60cm or larger, and some which hold 10" of bedding.

Most colorful wire cages that are sold in pet shops don't meet both size and safety requirements and can cause stress for hamsters. Cages with more height than width or length are not recommended, as hamsters are burrowing animals and thus need more floor space.

=== Plastic tank cages ===
Plastic tank cages range from simple boxes to elaborately designed structures with tubes, tunnels, and separate rooms to encourage exploration. Many plastic tank cages are designed to be expanded with additional modules that connect to the main pen with clamps or tunnels. These modules are generally sold separately.

Due to the design of plastic cages, hamsters may be able to gnaw on parts of the interior. Pens are not designed to be chewed, however, if a cage is large enough, and if a hamster has other things to gnaw, then most hamsters will not chew on the cage. Syrian hamsters are more likely to chew small tubes and cages that are designed for smaller hamsters.

Most plastic cages are too small for hamsters, causing them to become bored and display unwanted behaviors, such as obsessive bar-chewing, repetitive climbing, aggression, or attempting escape. Smaller modules may have poor ventilation, increasing the risk of respiratory disease for the hamster.

=== Bin setups ===
Bin setups for hamsters are niche and one of the cheapest setup options, providing space and customization for hamsters. These setups are usually made from large plastic storage bins.

A key advantages of bin setups is their affordability, as they can often be assembled using readily available materials at a fraction of the cost of traditional setups. Also, bin setups offer better ventilation compared to glass enclosures, promoting better air circulation and lowering the risk of respiratory issues for hamsters.

Another benefit of bin setups is their flexibility, allowing for hamster owners to personalize their habitat with various decor and enrichment features to stimulate the hamster's natural behaviors and provide stimulation for such hamsters. Despite their basic setups, bin setups can provide a comfortable and enriching living space for hamsters when properly constructed and maintained.

=== Aquariums ===
Aquariums can be modified to serve as hamster cages. Hamsters cannot chew glass aquariums because the walls are smooth and there are no projections. Glass aquariums can be heavy and difficult to move, however, and it may be challenging to find an appropriate top to contain the hamster, most people decide to make the lid themselves using nails, wooden planks cut to size and chicken wire.

=== Wooden cages ===
Wooden cages for hamsters are not mass-marketed, but they are an option for hamster owners who are handy and wish to construct their own, or for breeders or rescuers who need to custom-make a large number of pens for multiple hamsters. Wooden cages must be made of untreated hardwood that a hamster can gnaw and eat, because over time they will chew the pen. Since the hamster may chew and ingest the cage material, using wood glue to hold the cage together is inappropriate, as it is poisonous to hamsters. In addition, wood tends to collect urine stains and scents, making it difficult to clean.

== Accessories ==
Hamsters enjoy toys for behavioral enrichment. The pouches of hamster's cheeks are used to carry food from foraging in the wilderness to their burrow and to encourage their hoarding tendencies; it is recommended to include sprays and scatter feeding. Hamster toys should be non-toxic and sanitized. Hamsters also enjoy going inside objects and climbing things. Some plastic toys and accessories can absorb heat, which is unsafe for dwarf hamsters in hot weather.

=== Hamster wheel ===
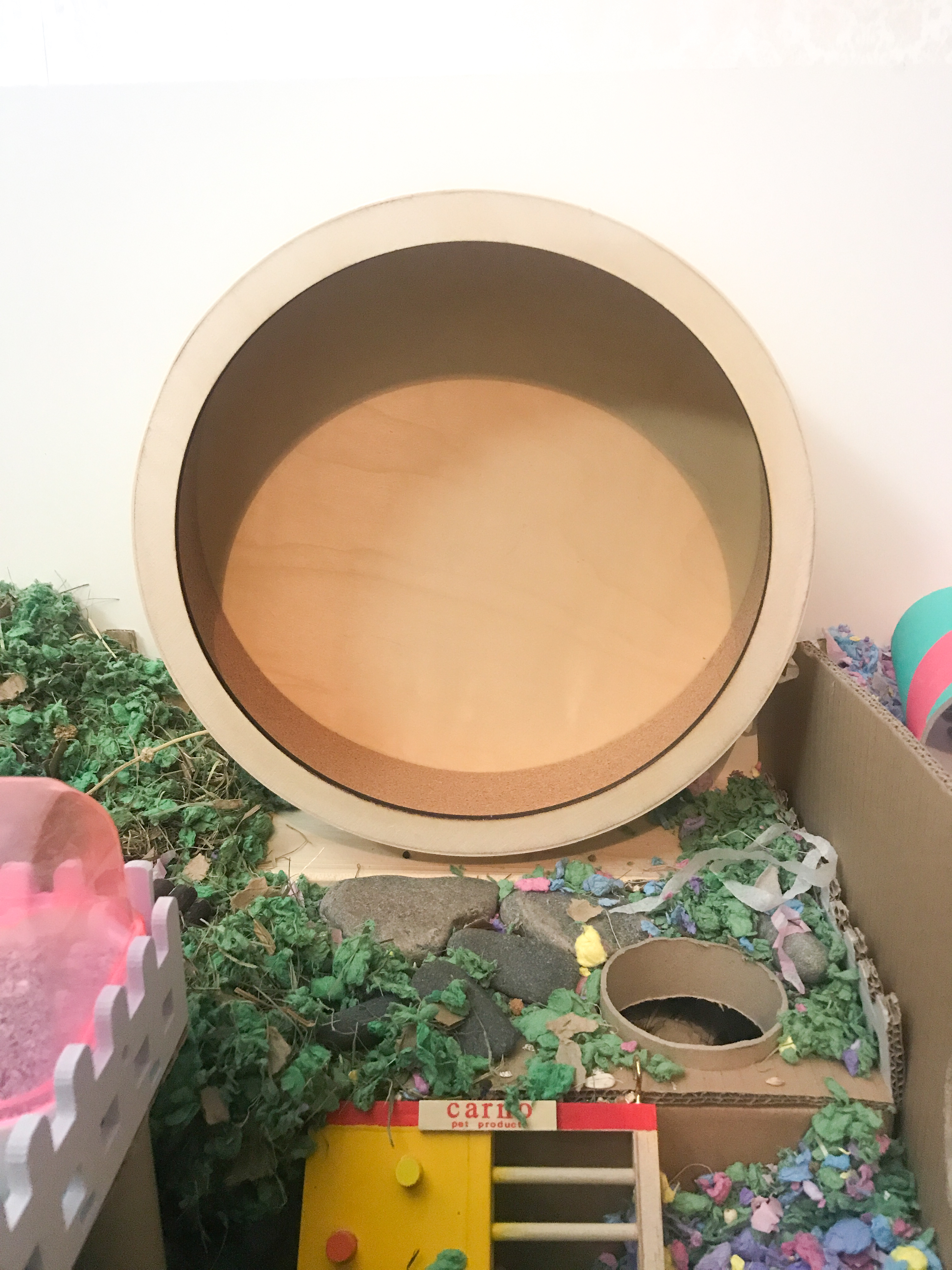
Wooden hamster wheel, size 33cm

Hamster wheels are exercise devices that allow hamsters to run, even in a confined space. Wheels intended for smaller species may not be appropriate for Syrian hamsters, but this information is not always divulged to consumers. The wheel should be large enough that the hamster runs with its back positioned flat. The Veterinary Association for Animal Welfare (TVT) recommends that wheels be at least 20 cm (7.9 in) for Dwarf hamsters and at least 30 cm (12 in) for Syrian hamsters, since wheels with smaller diameters can lead to permanent spinal curvature, especially in young animals. The TVT also recommends providing hamsters with a solid running surface, as rungs or mesh can catch limbs and cause injury.

=== Hamster hides ===
Since hamsters are nocturnal in captivity, dark sleeping quarters during daylight hours are vital. Hamster houses, or hide boxes, provide this. Houses can be as simple as an opaque PVC tube that is 15 cm (5.9 in) in diameter and is closed at one end, but boxes are preferred. Wooden houses or hideouts made of natural materials can help to keep hamsters cool in the summer.

Hamster houses should be well-ventilated to avoid condensation and dampness. Hide boxes improve the hamster's mental well-being, and the absence of a hide box can make them feel vulnerable and unsafe. Most hamsters will choose to nest and hoard food in their hideout, although some will use corners of the cage or even their wheel.

=== Hamster toilet ===
Hamsters are naturally clean animals and prefer to urinate in a designated corner of their cage. If their cage includes a suitable enclosed room, then the hamster is likely to use that room as a toilet area. Hamster keepers may suggest a toilet area to a hamster by putting soiled hamster bedding into the specific area. A large jar may be used as a toilet, but it must be removed and cleaned regularly.

=== Sand bath ===
All hamsters need a sand bath to groom themselves, as they should never be bathed in water. The sand keeps their fur clean, and digging in sand helps to maintain their claws. Sand for a sand bath should be fine, but not dusty, with no added dyes or chemicals. Reptile sand can be used as long as it does not contain calcium or any other additives. Another option is sanitized children's play sand. Some hamsters will also use their sand bath as a litter box.

=== Other toys ===
Like all other rodents, a hamster's teeth grow throughout its lifetime. As such, they need chew toys for proper dental care. Salt licks and mineral chews contain dangerous chemicals that are toxic for hamsters. Hamster owners must provide hardwood chews to prevent the hamster's teeth from growing too long, causing pain, disfigurement, and possible death.

== Unsafe hamster supplies ==
=== Hamster balls ===
Hamster balls are small, hollow spheres intended to allow hamsters to safely exercise outside of their cage. They are generally made of transparent plastic, contain air holes, and have a removable lid. TVT, the German veterinary association for animal welfare, warns that hamster balls can be hazardous, as hamsters cannot free themselves from the ball, and they cannot control its speed or direction. While in a hamster ball, especially a transparent one, hamsters cannot meet their natural instinct to take cover. Hamster balls may bang into walls or fall from raised surfaces, causing injury to the hamster. The small ventilation slots may not provide sufficient air supply for the hamster. TVT considers hamster balls to be dangerous, and they do not recommend them for any small mammal.

=== Plastic tubes ===
Plastic tubes can pose a large risk to a hamster's safety, especially when arranged into longer tunnel systems. The plastic tubes do not have sufficient ventilation, and if set at a steep angle, they can cause the hamster to fall and injure themselves. Many commercial tubes are also too small for larger hamster species, and they may become stuck in the tubes. Well-ventilated, short tubes that allow the hamster to comfortably turn around can be used safely.

=== Scented bedding ===
Bedding with added scents is not safe for hamsters. Scented bedding disrupts the animal's own scent markings, causing stress. The scent can also harm their sensitive respiratory system.

=== Harnesses and leashes ===
Since hamsters are small and fragile, harnesses and leashes can easily injure them. They also prevent hamsters from following their natural flight behavior, which can cause considerable stress.

=== Cotton fluff ===
Cotton fluff is a synthetic nesting material. It may be sold under other names, such as hamster fluff, cotton fluff, soft and safe bedding, fluff bedding etc. Cotton fluff has long fibers that resist tearing, and they can easily get stuck in a hamster's cheek pouches or wrap around their limbs, cutting off circulation. As a safe alternative to cotton fluff, some owners provide their hamsters with toilet paper for nesting purposes.

=== Cedar and pine bedding ===
Cedar and pine wood contains harmful oils that have been known to cause respiratory infections in small animals. Therefore, bedding made from cedar or pine is considered unsafe for hamsters.

== Housing multiple hamsters ==
Since hamsters are solitary animals, they can exhibit aggressive behavior when housed with other hamsters. If hamsters who live together are not compatible, they can seriously injure or kill one another. Therefore, it is recommended for most species of hamsters to live in separate cages. The Syrian hamster and Chinese hamster are particularly known for their unsocial behaviors, and must be housed singly. Dwarf hamsters have a greater chance of safely living in groups under the right conditions.

In some cases, two or three dwarf hamsters may be housed together if they are of the same sex and come from the same litter. Having multiple feeding areas and hides, as well as a very large cage may prevent aggression. Some hamsters will just never get along with others, and should never be in contact with another hamster.

== Escape ==
Hamsters will exploit any opportunity to escape from their cage. Housing a hamster in as large a habitat as possible and providing a variety of toys and other enrichment will stave off boredom and prevent it from wanting to escape. Most commonly, they escape when a cage door has not been closed properly. They have the ability to flatten their bodies, squeezing through very small holes and gaps. Hamsters may sometimes open latches or unscrew connections to open the cage themselves. Hamsters may also create escape holes by gnawing on the cage. If the hamster has access to both the inside of its cage and the outside world, it may collect some of its bedding and hoarded food to establish a new den. A bucket mousetrap is the most common way to catch a hamster. This trap places food, such as leafy greens, in a bucket that has a staircase leading up to it. The hungry hamster will climb the stairs, fall into the bucket, and be captured.

== Society and culture ==
The National Hamster Council in the United Kingdom maintains recommendations for hamster care for pet owners and breeders. Uk Pet Charities such as the Blue Cross, PDSA Vet charity and Woodgreen animal charity cite recommended cage sizes. Germany has a minimum welfare cage size. Additionally the Uk has the Animal Welfare Act 2006. United States regulations which apply to hamsters are in the Animal Welfare Act of 1966 and described further in the Institute for Laboratory Animal Research's Guide for the care and Use of Laboratory Animals including legal regulations for hamster cages in the United States.

== Additional reading ==
- Logsdail, Chris; Logsdail, Peter; Hovers, Kate (2002). Hamsterlopaedia : a complete guide to hamster care. Lydney: Ringpress. ISBN 1860542468.
- Field, Karl J.; Sibold, Amber L. (1999). The laboratory hamster & gerbil. Boca Raton, Florida: CRC Press. ISBN 0849325668.
