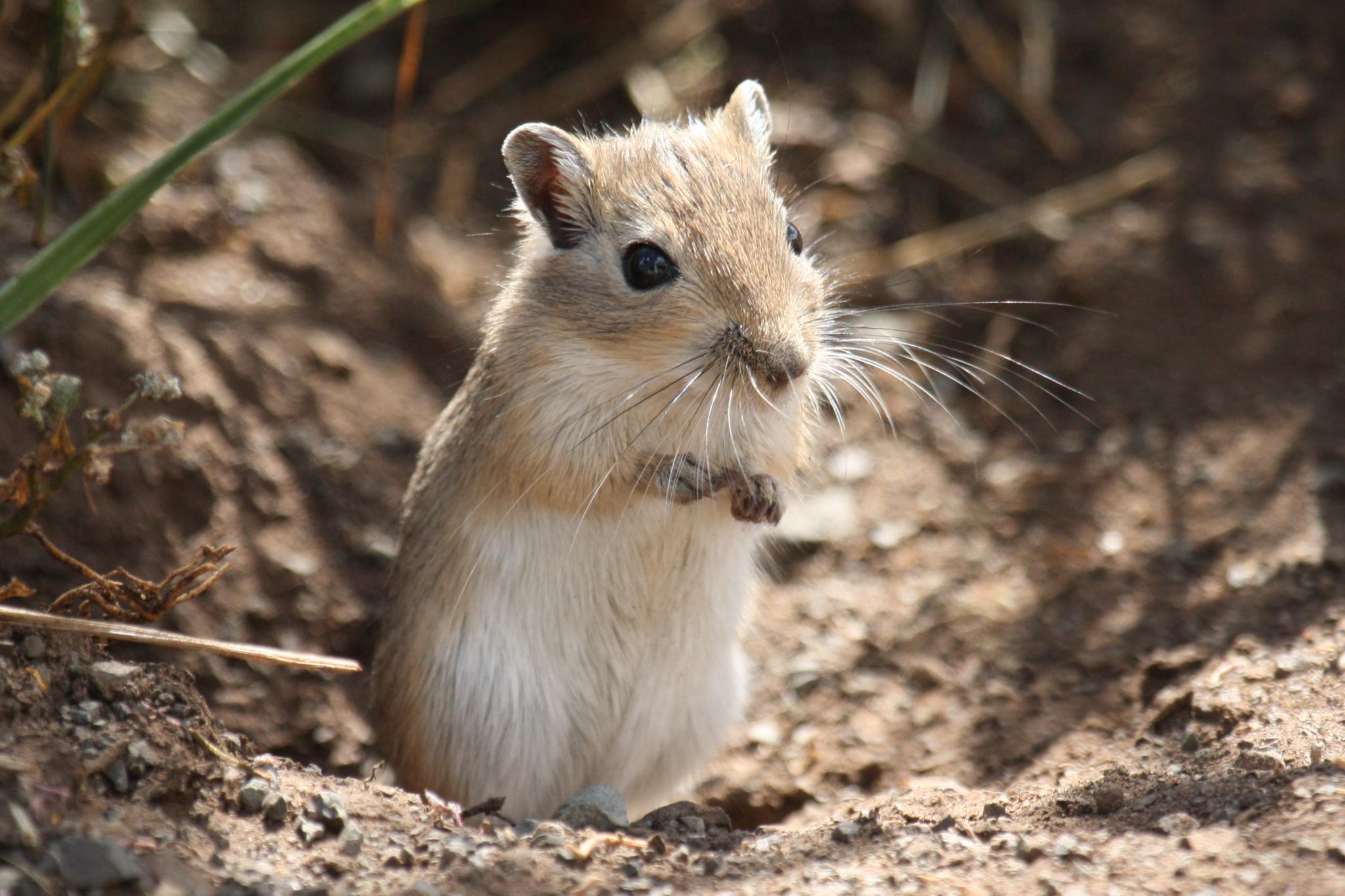
- Wild gerbil in Mongolia

Conservation status
- Least Concern (IUCN 3.1)

Scientific classification
- Kingdom: Animalia
- Phylum: Chordata
- Class: Mammalia
- Order: Rodentia
- Family: Muridae
- Genus: Meriones
- Species: M. unguiculatus

Binomial name
- Meriones unguiculatus (Milne-Edwards, 1867)

= Mongolian gerbil =

Species of mammal

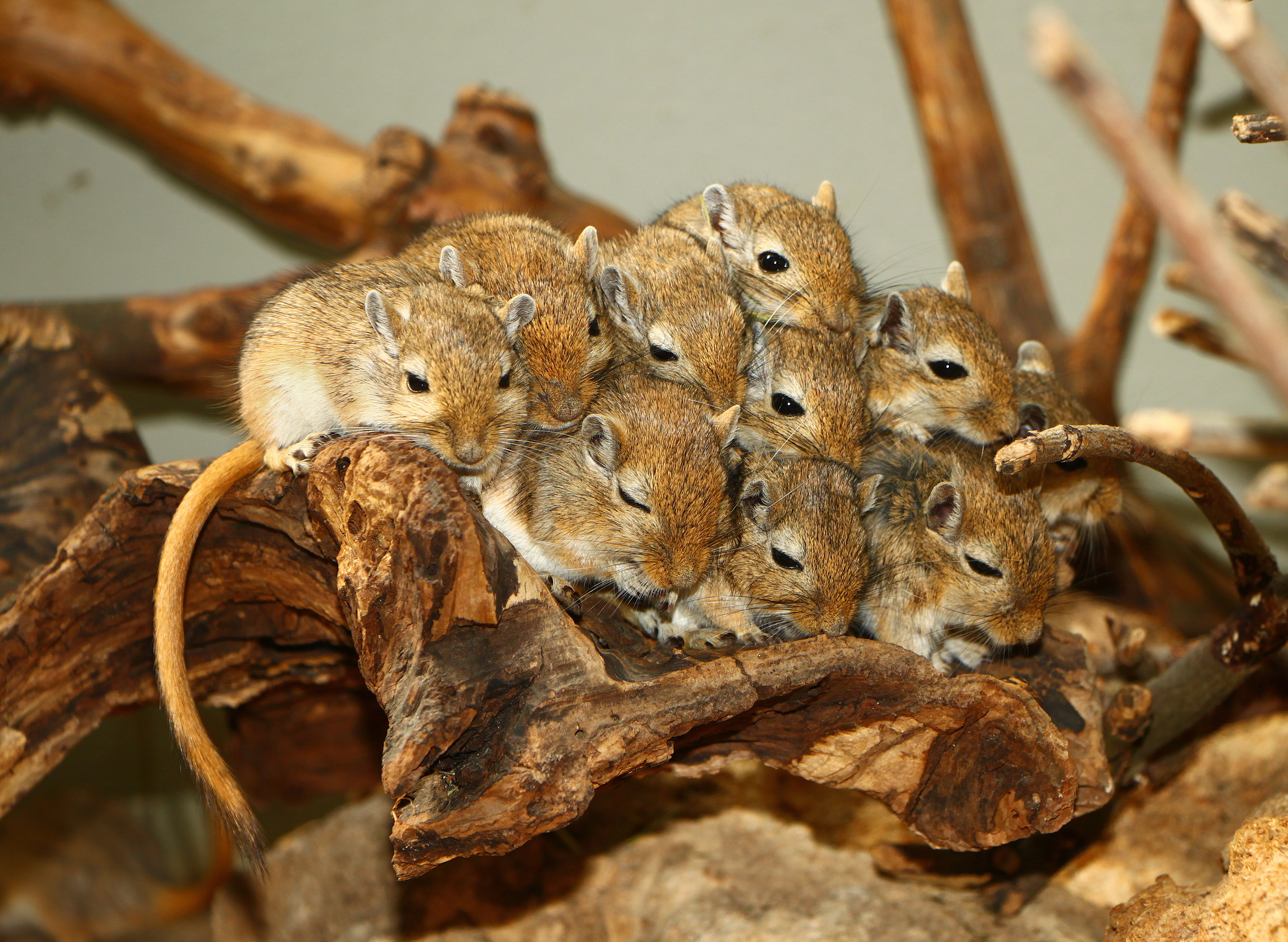
Wilhelma Zoo, Stuttgart, Germany

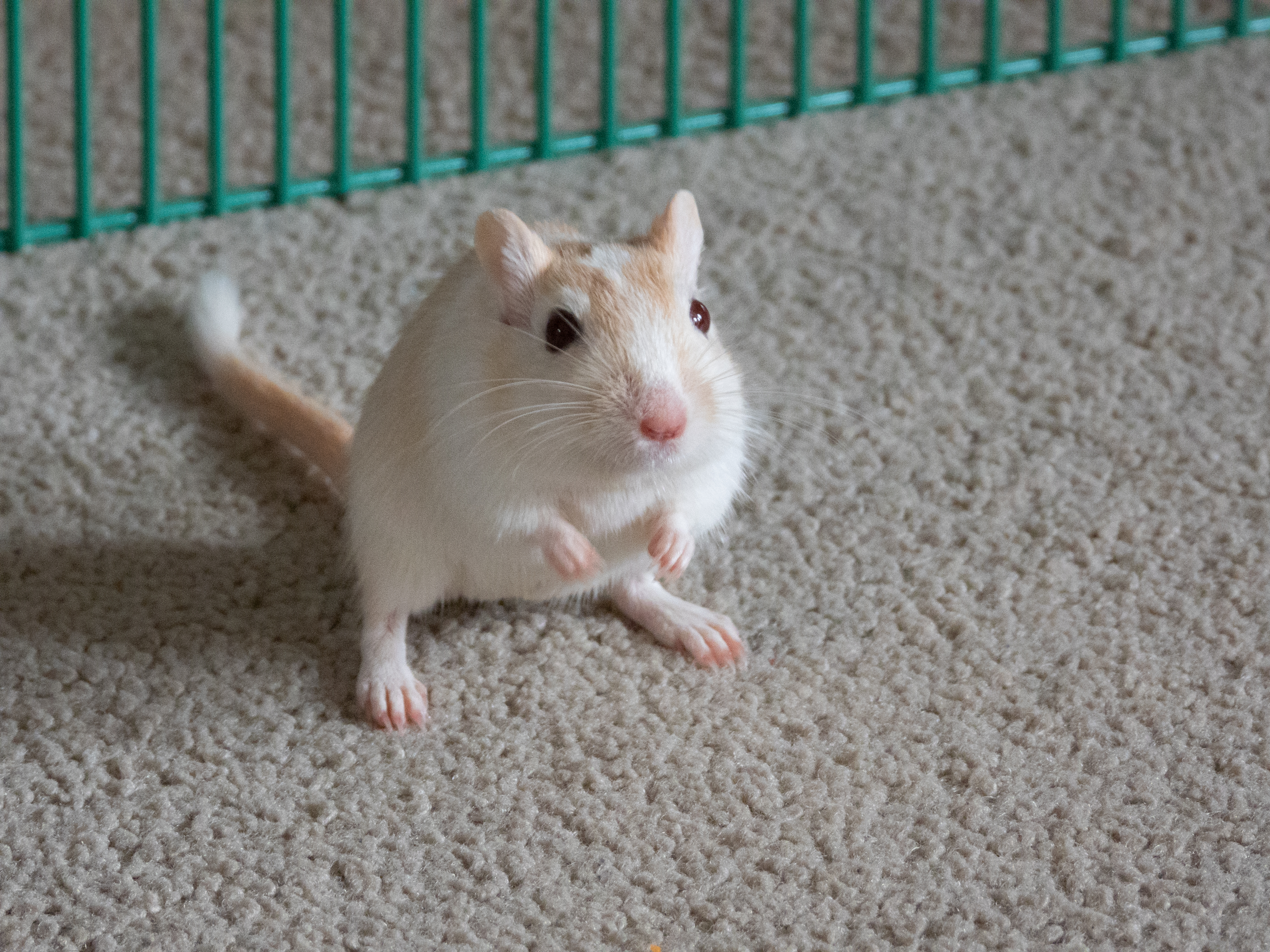
Pied cream gerbil in a curious pose

The Mongolian gerbil, also referred to as the Mongolian jird (Meriones unguiculatus), is a rodent belonging to the subfamily Gerbillinae. Their body size is typically 110–135 mm (4 1/4–5 1/4 in), with a 95–120 mm (3 3/4–4 3/4 in) tail, and body weight 60–130 g (2–4 1/2 oz), with adult males larger than females. The animal is used in science for research or kept as a small house pet. Their use in science dates back to the later half of the 19th century, but they only started to be kept as pets in the English-speaking world after 1954, when they were brought to the United States. However, their use in scientific research has declined.

== Taxonomy and evolution ==
The first known mention of gerbils came in 1866, by Father Armand David, who sent "yellow rats" to the French National Museum of Natural History in Paris, from northern China. They were named Gerbillus unguiculatus by the scientist Alphonse Milne-Edwards in 1867.

There is a popular misconception about the meaning of this scientific name, appearing both in printed works and in websites, due to the genus Meriones sharing the name with Greek warrior Meriones in Homer's Iliad; however, translations like "clawed warrior" are incorrect. The genus was named by Johann Karl Wilhelm Illiger in 1811, deriving from the Greek word μηρος (femur). Combined with 'unguiculate', meaning to have claws or nails in Latin, the name can be loosely translated as 'clawed femur'.

== Habitat ==
Mongolian gerbils inhabit grassland, shrubland and desert, including semidesert and steppes in China, Mongolia, and Russia.

Soil on the steppes is sandy and is covered with grasses, herbs, and shrubs. The steppes have cool, dry winters and hot summers. The temperature can get up to 50 °C (122 °F), but the average temperature for most of the year is around 20 °C (68 °F).

In the wild, these gerbils live in patriarchal groups generally consisting of one parental pair, the most recent litter, and a few older pups; sometimes the dominant female's sister(s) also live with them. Only the dominant females will produce pups, and will mostly mate with the dominant male while in estrus (heat), female gerbils are generally more loyal than male gerbils. One group of gerbils generally ranges over 325–1,550 square metres (400–1,900 sq yd).

A group lives in a central burrow with 10–20 exits. Some deeper burrows with only one to three exits in their territory may exist. These deeper burrows are used to escape from predators when they are too far from the central burrow.

== In science ==
Gerbils have a long history of use in scientific research, although nowadays they are rarely used. For example, in the United Kingdom in 2017, only around 300 Mongolian gerbils were used in experimental procedures, compared to over 2 million mice.

=== Tumblebrook Farm ===
Most gerbils used in scientific research are derived from the Tumblebrook Farm strain, which has its origins in 20 pairs of wild-caught Mongolian gerbils sent to Japan in 1935. Eleven of these animals were subsequently sent to Dr. V. Schwentker's Tumblebrook Farm in Brant Lake, New York, United States in 1954, with additional animals later sent to Charles River Ltd in Italy in 1996.

=== Hearing ===
Gerbils have a wide hearing range, from detection of low frequency foot drumming to higher frequency chirps and therefore may be a more suitable model of human hearing loss than mice and rats, which are high-frequency specialists.

=== Vocal ===
Male gerbils can produce ultrasonic sounds with frequencies ranging from approximately 27 to 35 kHz and amplitudes ranging from approximately 0 to 70 dBa. Their larynx is involved in the production of these ultrasonic sounds. Experimentation revealed five findings of interest, which are that adults only emit ultrasonic sounds when stimulated socially, males signal more frequently than females, dominant males are more active in vocalizations than subordinate males, ultrasounds are triggered by conspecific odors, and that d-amphetamine, a central nervous system stimulant, contributes high levels of ultrasounds while chlorpromazine, an antipsychotic medication, lowers the emission rate.

=== Epilepsy ===
10–20% of gerbils exhibit spontaneous epileptiform seizures, typically in response to a stressor such as handling or cage cleaning. Epilepsy in gerbils has a genetic basis, and seizure-prone and seizure-resistant lines have been bred.

=== Diabetes ===
Like other desert rodents such as fat sand rats, Mongolian gerbils are susceptible to diet-induced diabetes, although incidence is low. A diabetes-prone line has recently been generated, showing that gerbil diabetes has at least some genetic basis.

=== Genetics and genomics ===
Laboratory gerbils are derived from a small number of founders, and so genetic diversity was generally assumed to be low. Initial genetic studies based on small numbers of genetic markers appeared to support this, but more recent genome-wide Genotyping-by-Sequencing (GBS) data has shown that genetic diversity is actually quite high. It has been suggested that laboratory gerbils should be considered domesticated, and designated "M. unguiculatus forma domestica" to differentiate them from wild animals. A Mongolian gerbil genome sequence was published in 2018 and a genetic map comprising 22 linkage groups (one per chromosome) in 2019.

=== Reproduction ===
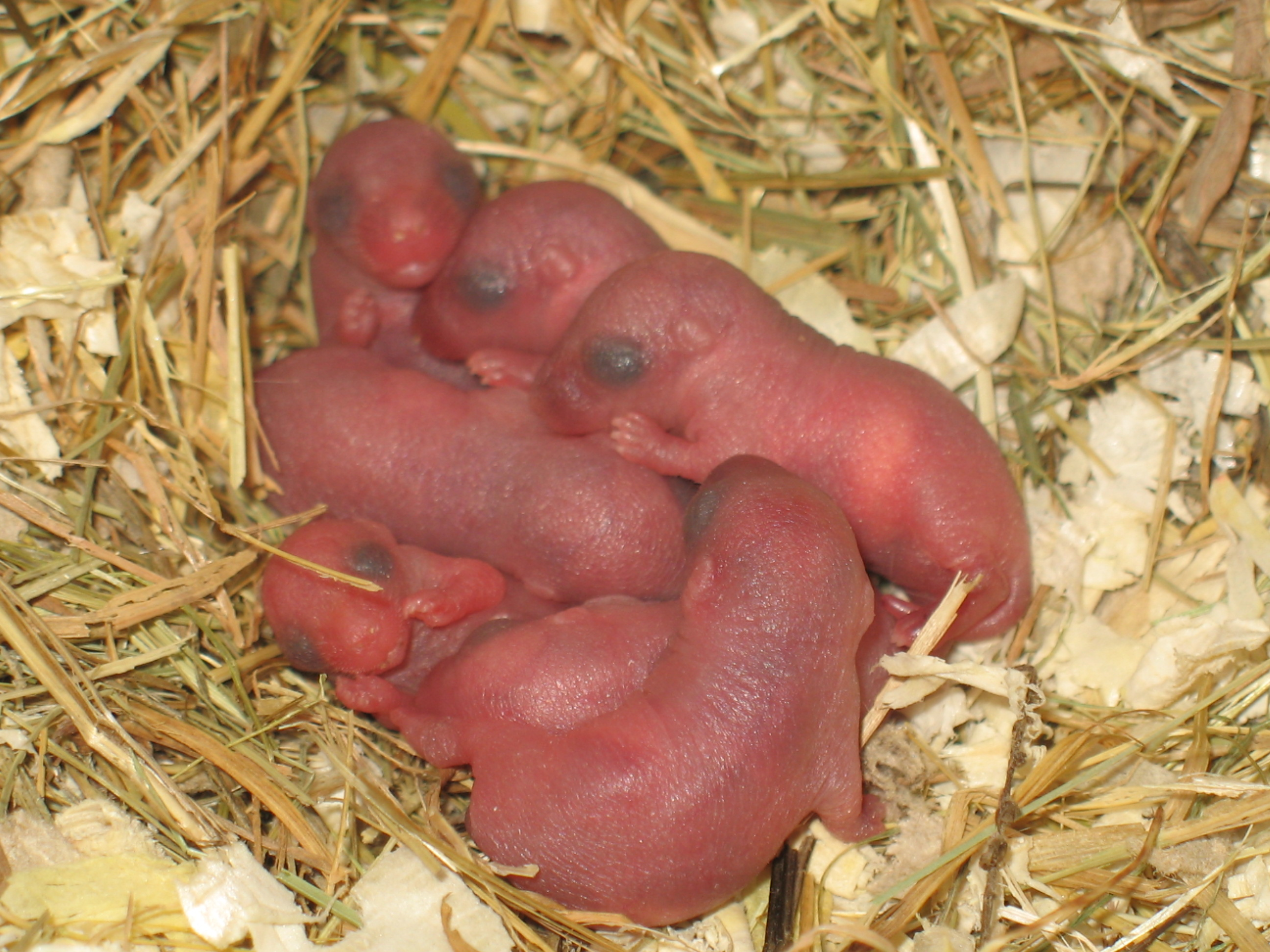
Mongolian gerbil young

In the wild, Mongolian gerbils breed in February and October. Males do not become sexually mature for about 70–80 days, while the vaginal opening occurs in females about 33–50 days after birth. For other gerbils such as the hairy footed gerbil, sexual maturity has a slightly earlier and longer window of 60–90 days in comparison with a later and shorter window for Mongolian gerbils, 70–84 days. Females reach sexual maturity shortly after this opening occurs. They experience oestrus cycles every 4–6 days. Mongolian gerbils are regarded as monogamous within science. Even with this said, many Mongolian gerbils have still been found in laboratory tests regarding their sexual reproduction behavior to have shown signs of promiscuity and mating with other females while their monogamous partner is absent in laboratory setting.

Gerbils are for the most part selective when it comes to picking a mate for copulation. An average litter size for the Mongolian gerbil is around 4–8 pups. If the litter only contains around 1–2 young then the mother will neglect them and they will die from starvation. Mongolian gerbils are monogamous and mate with their selected partner for life. When their mate dies, many gerbils refrain from seeking other mates to reproduce with. Males generally find new mates whereas females may not. When older females lose their mate they almost always give up on seeking reproduction. Their behavior tends to vary when faced with different settings; in the wild, the large population of gerbils means that finding and selecting a mate is not a problem. Within a laboratory setting, though, many gerbils tend to keep to themselves and refrain from copulation.

== Behavior ==
Gerbils are social animals and live in groups in the wild. They rely on their sense of smell to identify other members of their clan. Gerbils are known to attack and often kill those carrying an unfamiliar scent. Groups of gerbils often have a "dominant" gerbil which may "bully" the others by humping them.

== Diet ==
Gerbils naturally eat seeds of grasses, leaves, bulbs, and herbs. As pets, gerbils eat fruits such as pears, melons, apples, oranges and vegetables such as carrots, pumpkins, cucumbers, and fennels.

== Relationship with humans ==
=== As pets ===
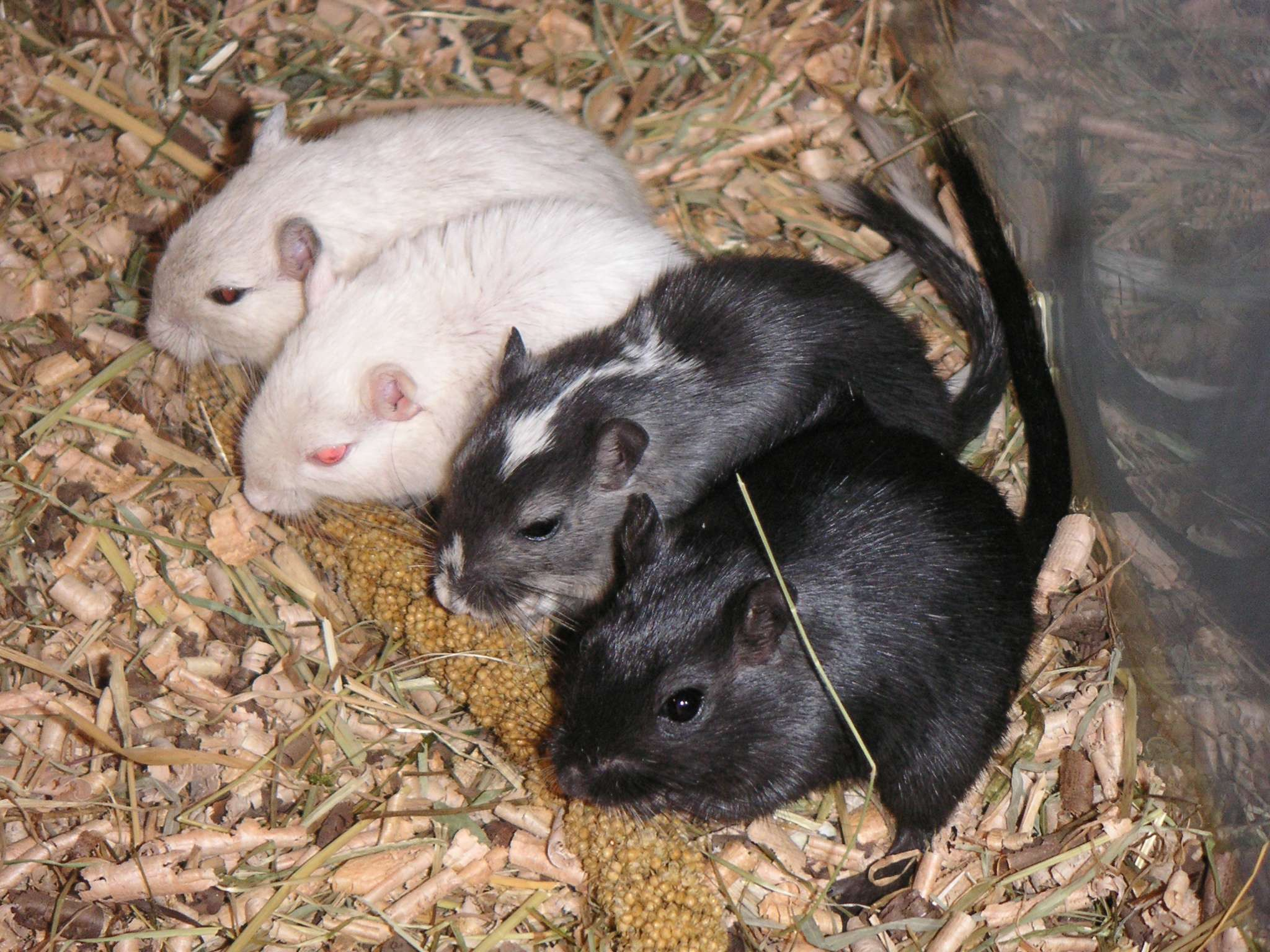
Pet gerbils eating millet

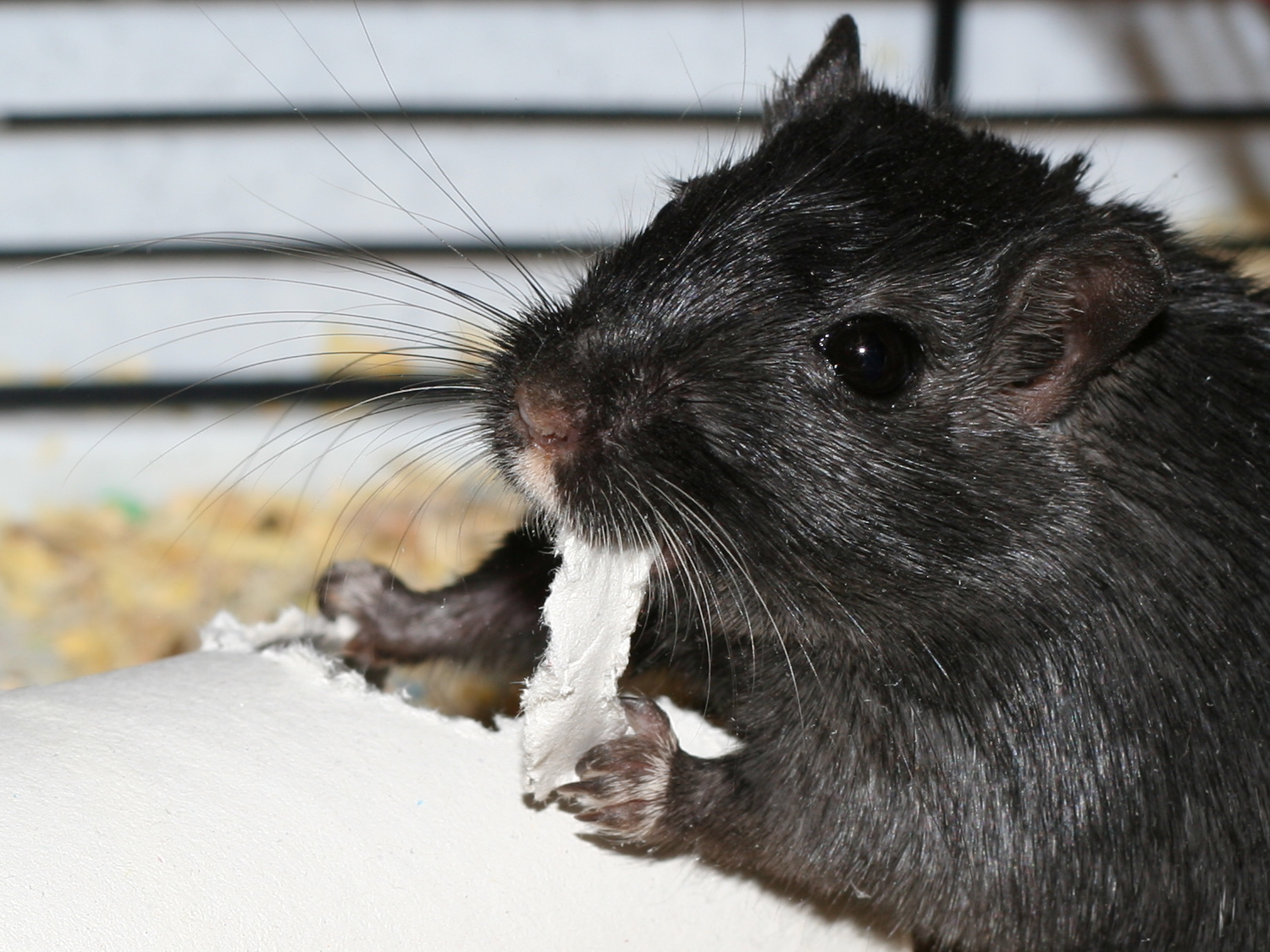
Pet gerbil chewing toilet paper

A gentle and hardy animal, the Mongolian gerbil has become a popular small house pet. It was first brought from China to Paris in the 19th century, and became a popular house pet there. It was later brought to the United States in 1954 by Dr. Victor Schwentker for use in research. Dr. Schwentker soon recognized their potential as pet animals. Selective breeding for the pet trade has resulted in a wide range of different color and pattern varieties. Gerbils became popular pets in the US around the late 1950s and were imported to the United Kingdom in 1964, where they became popular pets too. They are now found in pet shops throughout the UK and the US.

However, due to the threat they pose to indigenous ecosystems and existing agricultural operations, it is illegal to purchase, import, or keep a gerbil as a pet in the U.S. state of California. It is also illegal to import the animal into New Zealand and Australia.

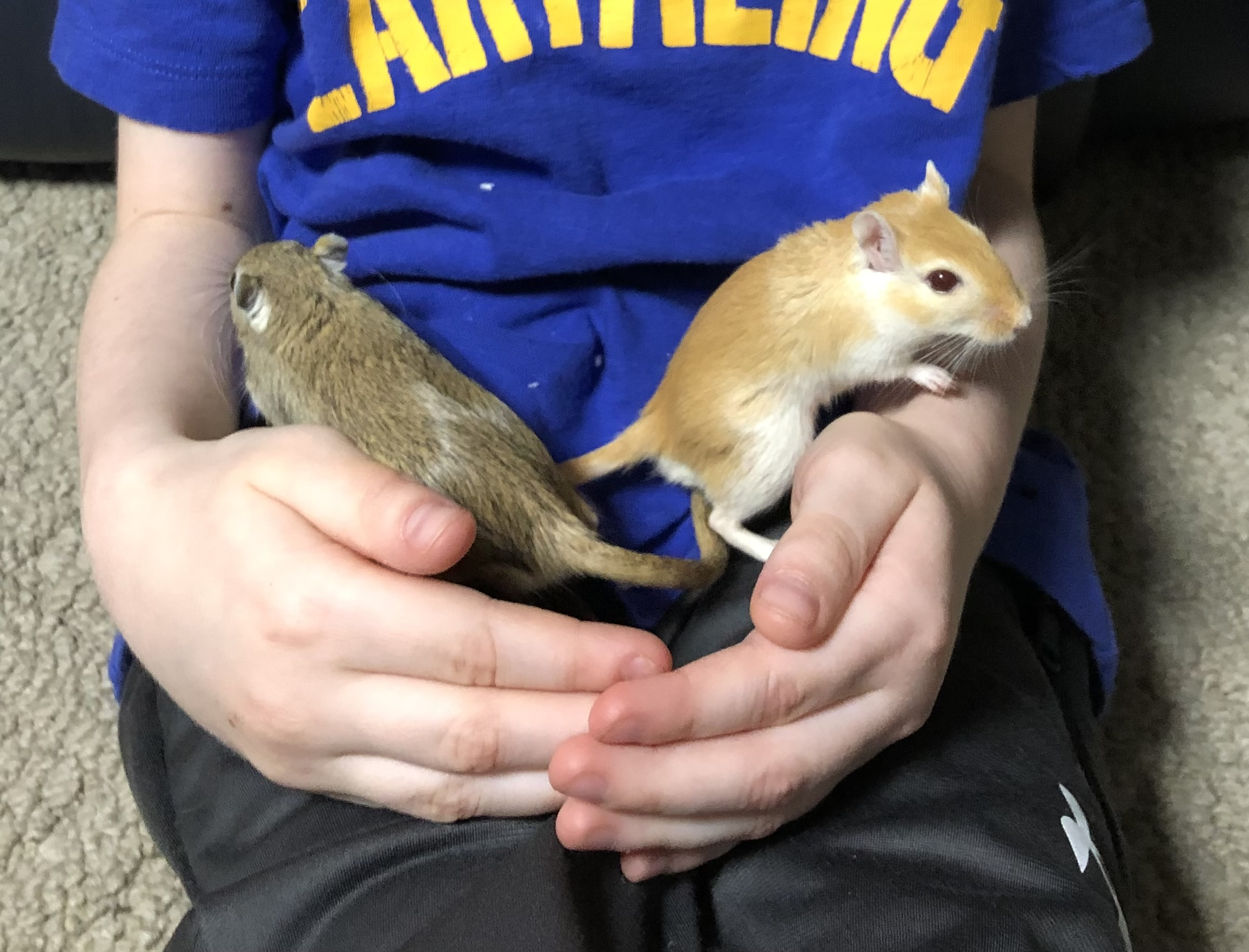
Gerbils enjoy human company.

Gerbils are typically not aggressive, and they rarely bite unprovoked or without stress. They are small and easy to handle, since they are sociable creatures that enjoy the company of humans and other gerbils. Gerbils also have adapted their kidneys to produce a minimum of waste to conserve body fluids, which makes them very clean with little odor. Gerbils have many different aesthetic coat patterns, such as pied slate, described below.

=== Health concerns ===
Misalignment of incisors due to injury or malnutrition may result in overgrowth, which can cause injury to the roof of the mouth. Symptoms include a dropped or loss of appetite, drooling, weight loss, or foul breath.

Common injuries are caused by gerbils being dropped or falling, often while inside of a hamster ball, which can cause broken limbs or a fractured spine (for which there is no treatment).

A common problem for all small rodents is neglect, which can cause the gerbils to not receive adequate food and water, causing serious health concerns, including dehydration, starvation, stomach ulcers, eating of bedding material, and cannibalism.

Between 20 and 50% of pet gerbils have the seizure disorder epilepsy. The seizures are thought to be caused by fright, handling, or a new environment. The attacks can be mild to severe, but do not typically appear to have any long-term effects, except for rare cases where death results from very severe seizures. A way to prevent a gerbil from having a seizure is to refrain from blowing in the animal's face (often used to "train" the pet not to bite). This technique is used in a lab environment to induce seizures for medical research.

Tumors, both benign and malignant, are fairly common in pet gerbils, and are most common in females over the age of two. Usually, the tumors involve the ovaries, causing an extended abdomen, or the skin, with tumors most often developing around the ears, feet, mid-abdomen, and base of the tail, appearing as a lump or abscess.

Gerbils can lose their tails due to improper handling, being attacked by another animal, or getting their tails stuck. The first sign is a loss of fur from the tip of the tail, then the skinless tail dies off and sloughs, with the stump usually healing without complications.

The most common infectious disease that gerbils experience are Tyzzer's disease, a bacterial disease, which stress can make animals more susceptible to. It produces symptoms such as ruffled fur, lethargy, hunched posture, poor appetite, diarrhea, and often death. It quickly spreads between gerbils in close contact.

A problem with the inner ear may cause a gerbil to lean noticeably to one side. This may be caused by ear infections. Gerbils with "extreme white spotting" colouring are susceptible to deafness; this is thought to be due to the lack of pigmentation in and around the ear.

=== Captive-bred gerbils ===
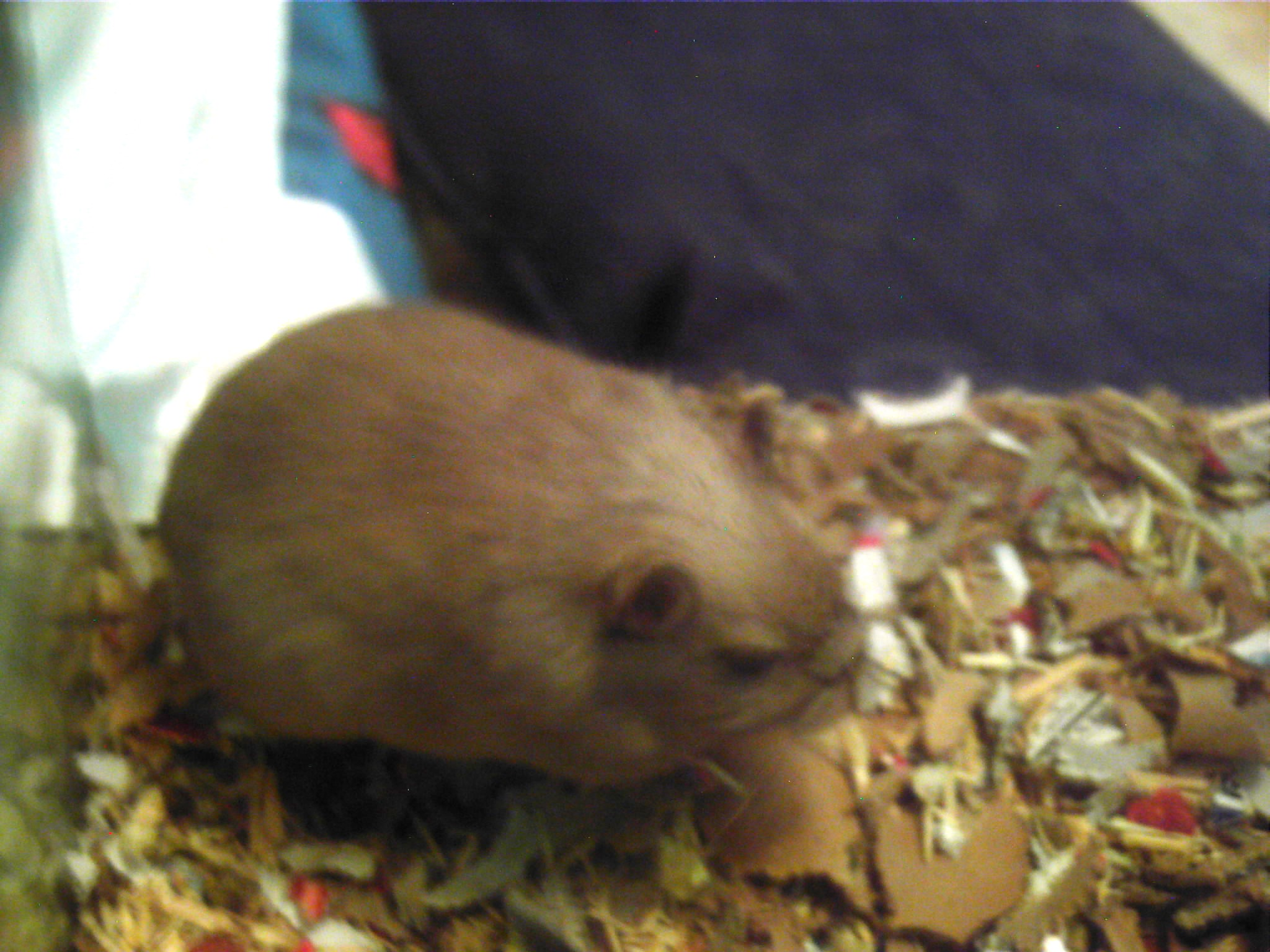
A Burmese colored gerbil

Many color varieties of gerbils are available in pet shops today, generally the result of years of selective breeding. Over 20 different coat colors occur in the Mongolian gerbil, which has been captive-bred the longest.

The fat-tailed gerbil or duprasi is also kept as a pet. They are smaller than the common Mongolian gerbils, and have long, soft coats and short, fat tails, appearing more like a hamster. The variation on the normal duprasi coat is more gray in color, which may be a mutation, or it may be the result of hybrids between the Egyptian and Algerian subspecies of duprasi.

White spotting has been reported in not only the Mongolian gerbil, but also the pallid gerbil and possibly Sundervall's jird.

A long-haired mutation, a grey agouti or chinchilla mutation, white spotting, and possibly a dilute mutation have also appeared in Shaw's jirds, and white spotting and a dilute mutation have shown up in bushy-tailed jirds.
