= Hamster ball =

Exercise toy for pet hamster

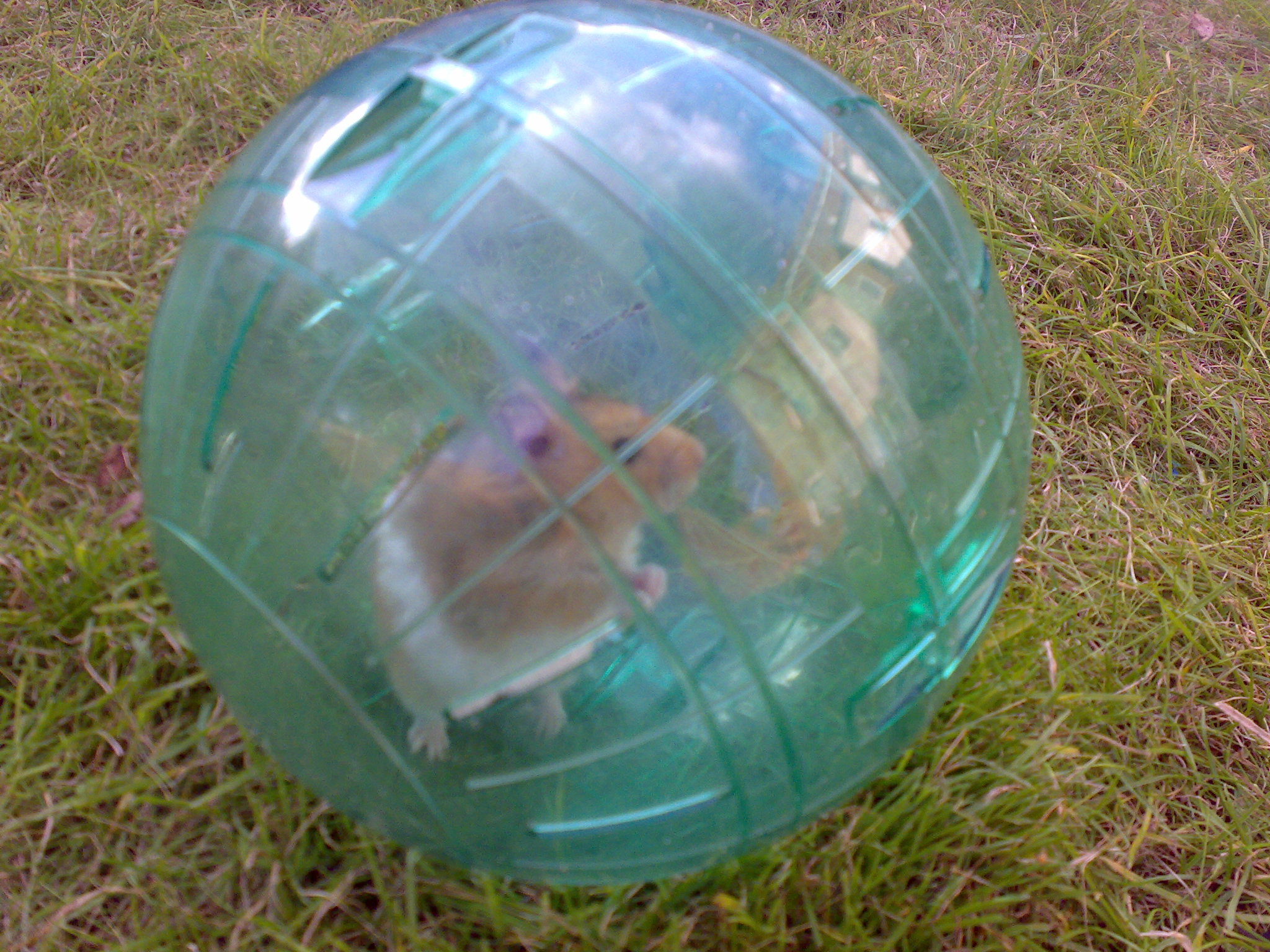
A hamster in a hamster ball

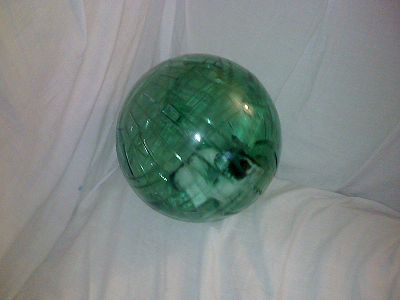
A mouse in green hamster ball

Hamster balls are hollow spheres made of clear plastic into which hamsters, gerbils, degus and other small rodent pets are placed, allowing them to run around outside their cages without the risk of running away or getting lost under furniture. They are designed to provide hamsters with exercise. Balls produce an audible rumble across most surfaces, making them easier to locate even when out of sight.

Hamster balls have been manufactured and sold since at least the 1970s. Most are made of durable transparent plastic with air holes and a small door or lid to allow the owner to insert or remove the hamster from the ball.

Although hamster balls are designed to protect hamsters, there are hazards such as stairs and other high places from which hamsters can fall, resulting in injury or even death. To protect hamsters, owners may place hamster balls on the lower level of their house, away from any stairs. Some owners also create a simple barrier near the stairs, so that they will not roll down the stairs.

Although hamster balls have air holes, hamsters should be allowed to take breaks and leave the ball regularly due to a lack of water that could induce heatstroke or exhaustion. It is important to keep watch over the hamster ball at all times while the pet is inside. The ball can pick up too much speed, causing the hamster to somersault inside and potentially be injured.

Hamster balls are recommended by the manufacturers for use with hamsters, gerbils, mice, degus and small rats only; they should not be used for chinchillas or guinea pigs, as their size and body structures are different from small rodents, posing a serious hazard to them if placed inside.

== Criticism ==
The Tierärztliche Vereinigung für Tierschutz (TVT), the German veterinary association for animal welfare, warns that hamster balls pose a risk of injury. TVT asserts that the hamster can not free itself from the ball, cannot control the speed or direction of the ball, and cannot meet the natural instinct to take cover. TVT warns of a risk for injury when the ball hits a wall or rolls down from raised surfaces, and deems the small ventilation slots to provide insufficient air supply for the hamster. TVT considers hamster balls to be anti animal welfare and do not recommend their use for any small mammal. The RSPCA is equally critical.

== See also ==
- Hamster wheel
- Hamster cage
- Zorbing
- Super Rhino, a character from (and title of a short film based upon) the animated film Bolt
