= Institute for Laboratory Animal Research =

American organization

The Institute for Laboratory Animal Research (ILAR) is a United States organization which develops and shares information and guidelines about animal testing and care of laboratory animals. It is a unit in the United States National Research Council. Their mission is "to evaluate and to report on scientific, technological, and ethical use of animals and related biological resources, and of non-animal alternatives in non-food settings, such as research, testing, education, and production of pharmaceuticals".

- Their core values are:
  - ILAR supports the responsible use of animals in research, testing, and education as a key component to advancing the health and quality of life of humans and animals.
  - ILAR promotes high-quality science and humane care and use of research animals based upon the principles of refinement, replacement, and reduction (the 3Rs) and high ethical standards.
  - ILAR fosters best practices that enhance human and animal welfare by organizing and disseminating information and by facilitating dialogue among interested parties.

An important influential factor to the formation of the ILAR was scientist Paul Weiss by holding a conference on Animal Procurements in July 1952. After the conference, the organization was recommended in November 1952 as the Institute of Animal Resources. In 1953, the Institute of Animal Resources was formally established under the NRC Division of Biology and Agriculture. In 1956 it became the Institute of Laboratory Animal Resources.

The ILAR website contains a variety of resources, including current news, resources, event information and highlights.

The institute is a part of the Division on Earth and Life Studies and continuously has studies in progress on their website that one can look into and research. Their current study in progress is called "Assessment of the Care and Use of Dogs in Research Funded by or Conducted at the U.S. Department of Veterans Affairs".

The Institute of Laboratory Animal Research also has a successful journal that started over 50 years ago in 1953. The most current published journal is the 57th volume and is currently being published by the Oxford University Press. The newest volume is called Models of Viral-Induced Carcinogenesis and Oncolytic Viruses. The volume discusses different cancer forms relating to a variety of different animals.

The ILAR also puts on workshops and one can look up previous workshops on their website.

In addition to the workshops they also put on events. You can find information on upcoming and previous events they have had on their website.

In 2011 the American Psychological Association criticized ILAR's 8th edition of the Guide for the Care and Use of Laboratory Animals for seeming like a list of requirements rather than guidelines.
