= Laboratory Syrian hamster =

Use of Syrian hamsters in the laboratory

Normal gait of an individual lab-bred hamster. Certain tests may change normal behavior.

Syrian hamsters (Mesocricetus auratus) are one of several rodents used in animal testing. Syrian hamsters are used to model human medical conditions including various cancers, metabolic diseases, non-cancer respiratory diseases, cardiovascular diseases, infectious diseases, and general health concerns. In 2014, Syrian hamsters accounted for 14.6% of the total animal research participants in the United States covered by the Animal Welfare Act.

== Use in research ==
Since 1972 the use of hamsters in animal testing research has declined. In 2014 in the United States, animal research used about 120,000 hamsters, which was 14.6% of the total research animal use (under the Animal Welfare Act which excludes mice, rats, and fish) for that year in that country. According to the Canadian Council for Animal Care, a total of 1,931 hamsters were used for research in 2013 in Canada, making them the sixth-most popular rodent after mice (1,233,196), rats (228,143), guinea pigs (20,687), squirrels (4,446) and voles (2,457).

== Human medical research ==
=== Cancer research ===
Humans get lung cancer from tobacco smoking. Syrian hamsters are a model for researching non-small-cell lung carcinoma, which is one of the types of human lung cancer. In research, when hamsters are injected with the carcinogen NNK several times over six months, they will develop that sort of cancer. In both Syrian hamsters and humans, this cancer is associated with mutations to the KRAS gene. For various reasons, collecting data on the way that Syrian hamsters develop this lung cancer provides insight on how humans develop it.

Oral squamous-cell carcinoma is a common cancer in humans and difficult to treat. Scientists studying this disease broadly accept Syrian hamsters as animal models for researching it. In this research, the hamster is given anesthesia, has its mouth opened to expose the inside of its cheeks, and the researcher brushes the carcinogen DMBA on its cheeks. The scientist can take cell samples from the mouth of the hamster to measure the development of the cancer. This process has good reproducibility. The cancer itself develops tumors in a predictable way starting with hyperkeratosis, then hyperplasia, then dysplasia, then carcinoma. In humans with this cancer there is increased ErbB2 production of receptor tyrosine kinase and Syrian hamsters with this cancer also have increased levels of that kinase. As the tumor develops in the hamster, they also have increased gene expression in p53 and c-myc which is similar to human cancer development. Because hamsters develop this cancer so predictably, researchers are comfortable in using hamsters in research on prevention and treatment.

There is scientific and social controversy about the virus SV40 causing cancers in human. Leaving that controversy aside, Syrian hamsters injected with SV40 certainly will develop various cancers in predictable ways depending on how they are exposed to the virus. The hamster has been used as a research model to clarify what SV40 does in humans.

The golden hamster can contract contagious reticulum cell sarcoma which can be transmitted from one golden hamster to another by means of the bite of the mosquito Aedes aegypti.

=== Metabolic disorders ===
Syrian hamsters are susceptible to many metabolic disorders which affect humans. Because of this, hamsters are an excellent animal model for studying human metabolic disorder.

Gallstones may be induced in Syrian hamsters by giving the hamster excess dietary cholesterol or sucrose. Hamsters metabolize cholesterol in a way that is similar to humans. Different sorts of fats are more or less likely to produce gallstones in hamsters. The gender differences in gallstone formation in hamsters is significant. Hamsters of different genetic strains have significant differences in susceptibility to forming gallstones.

Diabetes mellitus is studied in various ways using Syrian hamsters. Hamsters which are feed fructose for 7 days get hyperinsulinemia and hyperlipidemia. Such hamsters then have an increase in hepatic lipase and other measurable responses which are useful for understanding diabetes in humans. Streptozotocin or alloxan may be administered to induce chronic diabetes in hamsters.

Atherosclerosis may be studied with Syrian hamsters because both organisms have similar lipid metabolism. Hamsters develop atherosclerosis as a result of dietary manipulation. Hamsters develop atherosclerotic plaques as humans do.

=== Non-cancer respiratory disease ===
Smoke inhalation can be studied on Syrian hamsters by putting the hamster in a laboratory smoking machine. Pregnant hamsters have been used to model the effects of smoking on pregnant humans.

The emphysema component of COPD may be induced in hamsters by injecting pancreatic elastase into their tracheas.

Pulmonary fibrosis may be induced in hamsters by injecting bleomycin into their tracheas.

=== Cardiovascular ===
Cardiomyopathy in hamsters is an inherited condition and there are genetic lines of hamsters which are bred to retain this gene so that they may be used to study the disease.

Microcirculation may be studied in hamster cheek pouches. The pouches of hamsters are thin, easy to examine without stopping bloodflow, and highly vascular. When examined, the cheek pouch is pulled through the mouth while being grasped with forceps. At this point the cheek is everted and can be pinned onto a mount for examination.

Reperfusion injury may be studied with everted hamster pouches also. To simulate reperfusion, one method is to tie a cuff around the pouch to restrict blood flow and cause ischemia. Another method could be to compress the veins and arteries with microvascular clips which do not cause trauma. In either case, after about an hour of restricting the blood, the pressure is removed to study how the pouch recovers.

Several inbred strains of hamsters have been developed as animal models for human forms of dilated cardiomyopathy. The gene responsible for hamster cardiomyopathy in a widely studied inbred hamster strain, BIO14.6, has been identified as being delta-sarcoglycan. Pet hamsters are also potentially prone to cardiomyopathy, which is a not infrequent cause of unexpected sudden death in adolescent or young adult hamsters.

=== Infection research ===
Syrian hamsters have been infected with a range of disease causing agents to study both the disease and the cause of the disease.

Hantavirus pulmonary syndrome is a medical condition in humans caused by any of the Hantavirus species. Syrian hamsters easily contract Hantavirus species, but they do not get the same symptoms as humans, and the same infection that is deadly in humans have effects ranging from nothing to flu to death in Syrian hamsters. Because hamsters become easily infected, they are used to study the pathogenesis of Hantavirus. Andes virus and Maporal viruses infect hamsters and cause pneumonia and edema. The Sin Nombre virus and Choclo virus will infect hamsters but not cause any disease.

SARS coronavirus causes severe acute respiratory syndrome in humans. Syrian hamsters may be infected with the virus, and like humans will have viral replication and lesions in the respiratory tract which can be examined with histopathological tests. However, hamsters do not develop clinical symptoms of the disease. Hamsters might be used to study the infection process.

Leptospira viruses cause Leptospirosis in humans and similar symptoms in Syrian hamsters. Syrian hamsters are used to test drugs to treat the disease.

Bacteria that have been studied by infection Syrian hamsters with them include Leptospira, Clostridioides difficile, Mycoplasma pneumoniae, and Treponema pallidum.

Parasites which have been studied by infecting Syrian hamsters with them include Toxoplasma gondii, Babesia microti, Leishmania donovani, Trypanosoma cruzi, Opisthorchis viverrini, Taenia, Ancylostoma ceylanicum, and Schistosoma.

Syrian hamsters are infected with scrapie so that they get transmissible spongiform encephalopathy.

In March 2020, researchers from the University of Hong Kong have shown that Syrian hamsters could be a model organism for COVID-19 research.

=== Other medical conditions ===
Scientists use male hamsters to study the effects of steroids on male behavior. The behavior of castrated hamsters is compared to typical male hamsters. Castrated hamsters are then given steroids and their behavior noted. Some steroid treatments will cause castrated hamsters to do behaviors that typical male hamsters do.

Poor nutrition may cause female infertility in mammals. When hamsters do not have enough of the right food, they have fewer estrous cycles. Studies in hamsters identify the nutritional needs for maintaining fertility.

Syrian hamsters are used to study how NSAIDs can cause reactive gastropathy. One way to study is to inject hamsters with indometacin, which causes an ulcer within 1–5 hours depending on the dose. If repeatedly given doses, hamsters get severe lesions and die within 5 days from peptic ulcers in their pyloric antrum. A model for creating a chronically ill hamster which will not die from the ulcers is to give naproxen by gavage. When the hamster is chronically ill, it can be used to test anti-ulcer drugs.

Syrian hamsters are also widely used in research into alcoholism, by virtue of their large livers, and ability to metabolise high doses.

== Research on Syrian hamsters themselves ==
In captivity, golden hamsters follow well-defined daily routines of running in their hamster wheel, which has made them popular subjects in circadian rhythms research. For example, Martin Ralph, Michael Menaker, and colleagues used this behavior to provide definitive evidence that the suprachiasmatic nucleus in the brain is the source of mammalian circadian rhythms.

Hamsters have a number of fixed action patterns that are readily observed, including scent-marking and body grooming, which is of interest in the study of animal behavior.

Scientific studies of animal welfare concerning captive golden hamsters have shown they prefer to use running wheels of large diameters (35 cm diameter was preferred over 23 cm, and 23 cm over 17.5 cm,), and that they prefer bedding material which allows them to build nests, if nesting material is not already available. They prefer lived-in bedding (up to two weeks old – longer durations were not tested) over new bedding, suggesting they may prefer bedding changes at two-week intervals rather than weekly or daily. They also prefer opaque tubes closed at one end, 7.6 cm in diameter, to use as shelter in which to nest and sleep.
