= Tyzzer's disease =

Bacterial disease of mammals

Tyzzer's disease is an acute epizootic bacterial disease found in rodents, rabbits, dogs, cats, birds, pandas, deer, foals, cattle, and other mammals including gerbils and spinifex hopping-mice (Notomys alexis). It is caused by the spore-forming bacterium Clostridium piliforme, formerly known as Bacillus piliformis. It is an infectious disease characterized by necrotic lesions on the liver, is usually fatal, and is present worldwide. Animals with the disease become infected through oral ingestion of the bacterial spores and usually die within a matter of days. Animals most commonly affected include young, stressed animals in laboratory environments, such as immature rodents and rabbits. Most commonly affected wild animals include muskrats (Ondatra zibethicus) and occasionally cottontail rabbits (Sylvilagus spp.). Even today, much remains unknown about Tyzzer's disease, including how and why it occurs.

== Distribution ==
Although Tyzzer's disease is commonly found in laboratory animals worldwide, infected wild animal populations have been identified in North America and Australia. Specific locations where the disease has been reported in the United States include Connecticut, Idaho, Iowa, Maryland, Michigan, Montana, Ohio, Wisconsin, and Wyoming. In Canada, it has been reported in British Columbia, Manitoba, Ontario, and Saskatchewan. Outbreaks in these locations are primarily attributed to muskrat populations; however infected cottontail rabbits have been discovered in Maryland.

== Transmission ==
Tyzzer's disease is transmitted horizontally through the fecal-oral route. Bacterial spores within infected fecal matter can contaminate soil or feed and become orally ingested by a viable host. Success of the disease is determined by the amount and virulence of the bacteria and the resistance of the host. Laboratory animals are more susceptible to this disease, as bacteria spores from infected feces can survive in bedding at room temperature for over one year. Animals do occasionally transfer the disease asymptomatically, acting as carriers. Infected animals are more likely to develop the disease when subjected to stressful conditions.

== Clinical Signs ==
Common clinical signs of Tyzzer's Disease include watery diarrhea, depression, emaciation, and a ruffled coat. Other observed clinical signs include melena, depression, lethargy, and decreased temperature. In muskrats, this disease is characterized by extensive hemorrhaging within the lower intestine and abdomen. Due to the fast-acting nature of this disease, infected individuals often do not live long enough to exhibit symptoms. It is not uncommon for an infected animal to die within 1–10 days of disease contraction.

During necropsy, inflammation of the ileum, cecum, and colon are commonly present. Perhaps the most distinctive trait of this disease, however, is the grayish yellow necrotic lesions found on the liver of diseased animals. The number of these spots present can range from one to countless. Occasionally, lesions are discovered in the lower intestinal tract and heart as well. Even with physical signs and symptoms present, a conclusive diagnosis is dependent upon the presence of C. piliforme within the liver of the infected animal.

== Prevention ==
In laboratory animals, prevention includes a low-stress environment, an adequate amount of nutritional feed, and appropriate sanitation measurements. Because animals likely ingest bacterial spores from contaminated bedding and feed, regular cleaning is a helpful method of prevention. No prevention methods are currently available for wild animal populations.

== Treatment and Control ==
Currently, antibiotic drugs such as penicillin or tetracycline are the only effective methods for disease treatment. Within wild populations, disease control consists of reducing the amount of bacterial spores present in the environment. This can be done by removing contaminated carcasses and scat.

== History ==
Tyzzer's disease was first discovered by parasitologist Ernest Tyzzer in 1917 when his entire colony of Japanese waltzing mice suddenly died. Upon closer observation, Tyzzer discovered necrotic lesions and spore-forming bacillus in the livers of the deceased mice. This led Tyzzer to name the bacteria Bacillus piliformis and deem it the cause of this new disease. Later on, B. piliformis was renamed C. piliforme. In the 1940s, a biologist named Paul Errington found a fatal condition in Iowa muskrat populations that he believed to be a new disease. Dead muskrats were found with blood around their anus and internal bleeding, therefore Errington called this new condition “hemorrhagic disease”. Upon necropsy, lesions were found on the liver of the deceased muskrats. While hemorrhagic disease was identified in dead muskrats across North America, the causative agent remained undetermined. After Errington's death, the name “hemorrhagic disease” was changed to “Errington’s disease”. It was not until 1971 that the two diseases were discovered to be the same, upon which the name was reverted to “Tyzzer’s disease”.
