= Clostridium piliforme =

Scientific classification
- Domain: Bacteria
- Kingdom: Bacillati
- Phylum: Bacillota
- Class: Clostridia
- Order: Eubacteriales
- Family: Clostridiaceae
- Genus: Clostridium
- Species: C. piliforme

Binomial name
- Clostridium piliforme (ex Tyzzer 1917) Duncan et al. 1993

Synonyms
- Bacillus piliformis; "Tyzzerella piliformis" (Duncan et al. 1993) Yutin and Galperin 2013

Species of bacterium

Clostridium piliforme is an anaerobic, motile, gram-positive bacterium. It is the causing agent of Tyzzer's disease in various mammals.

== Taxonomy ==
C. piliforme was assigned to the genus Clostridium, where it was later ordered to the Cluster XIVb, being closely related to C. colinum. In 2013, it was proposed to be moved to the new genus "Tyzzerella" in the family of Lachnospiraceae.

== Sources ==
- "Clostridium piliforme (Tyzzer's bacillus): Duncan et al. 1993". National Center for Biotechnology Information (NCBI).
- UniProt. "Clostridium piliforme".
