= Hide box =

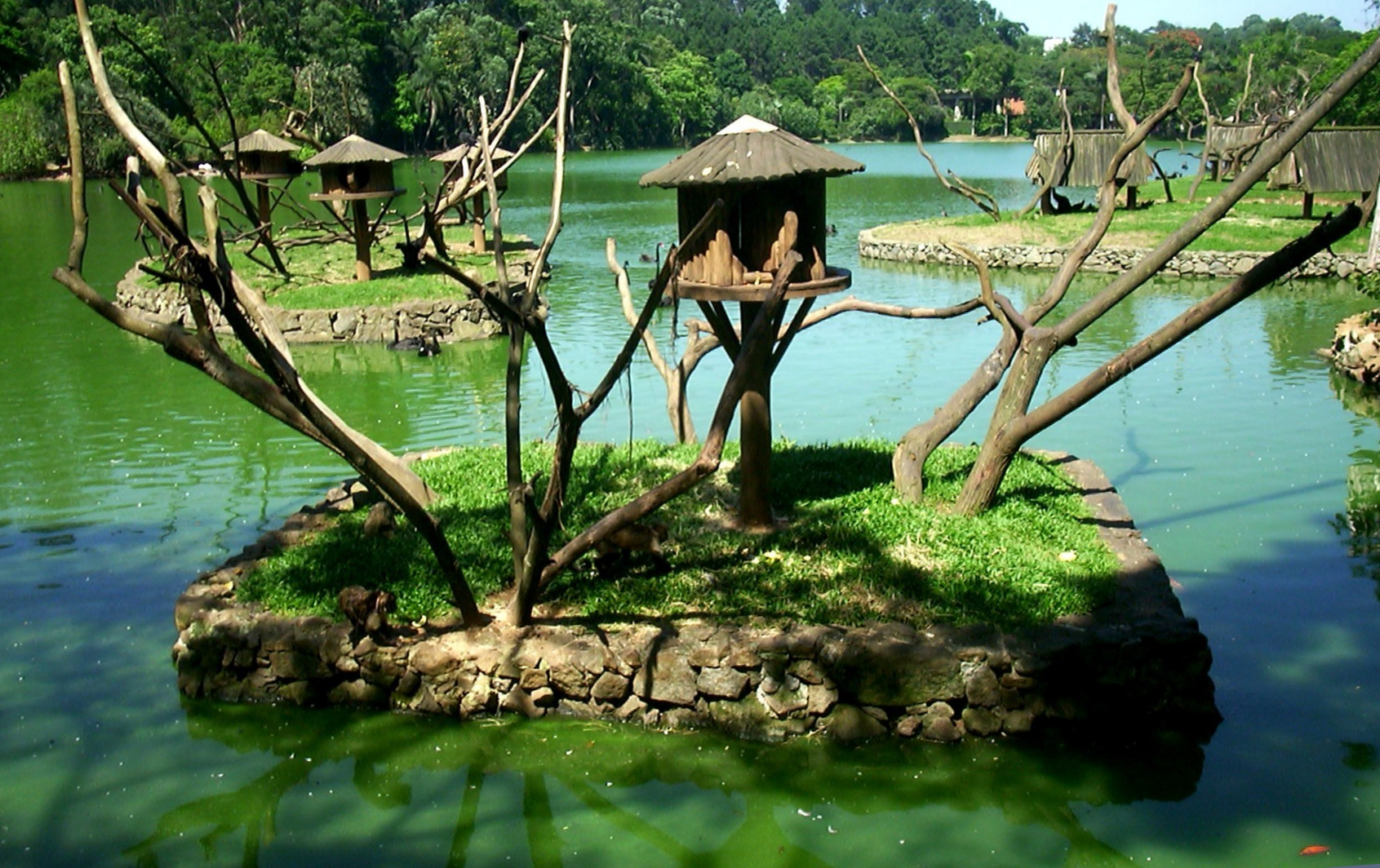
Hide boxes on free monkey's islands at the São Paulo Zoo

A hide box is a box placed in an animal's enclosure which allows it to hide from view.

Many species of animals are easily stressed by the presence of humans or activity when they are kept in a captive situation. Most of these animals benefit from having a hiding area in their enclosure, where they can retreat from view and feel secure.

Hide boxes can be made of a variety of materials: wood, plastic, cardboard, or ceramic. Something easy to clean and sterilize is preferred. While an actual box can be constructed, hide boxes may also be shaped like natural caves, fallen logs or bark, or tunnels. In general, a hide box should be large enough for the animal to fit into completely and comfortably, but small enough that the animal within it can feel the walls and ceiling close around it.

Hide boxes may also be placed high in trees, as homes for birds to breed in. This provides both protection from predators (for endangered species) as well as protection from the elements.

== See also ==
- Captive breeding
- Menagerie
- Zoological park
