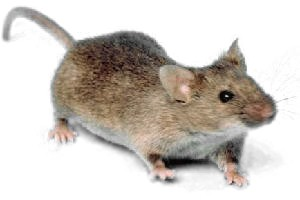

Conservation status
- Least Concern (IUCN 3.1)

Scientific classification
- Kingdom: Animalia
- Phylum: Chordata
- Class: Mammalia
- Order: Rodentia
- Family: Muridae
- Genus: Mus
- Subgenus: Mus
- Species: M. musculus

Binomial name
- Mus musculus Linnaeus, 1758

Subspecies
- Mus musculus bactrianus; Mus musculus castaneus; Mus musculus domesticus; Mus musculus gentilulus; Mus musculus molossinus; †Mus musculus muralis; Mus musculus musculus
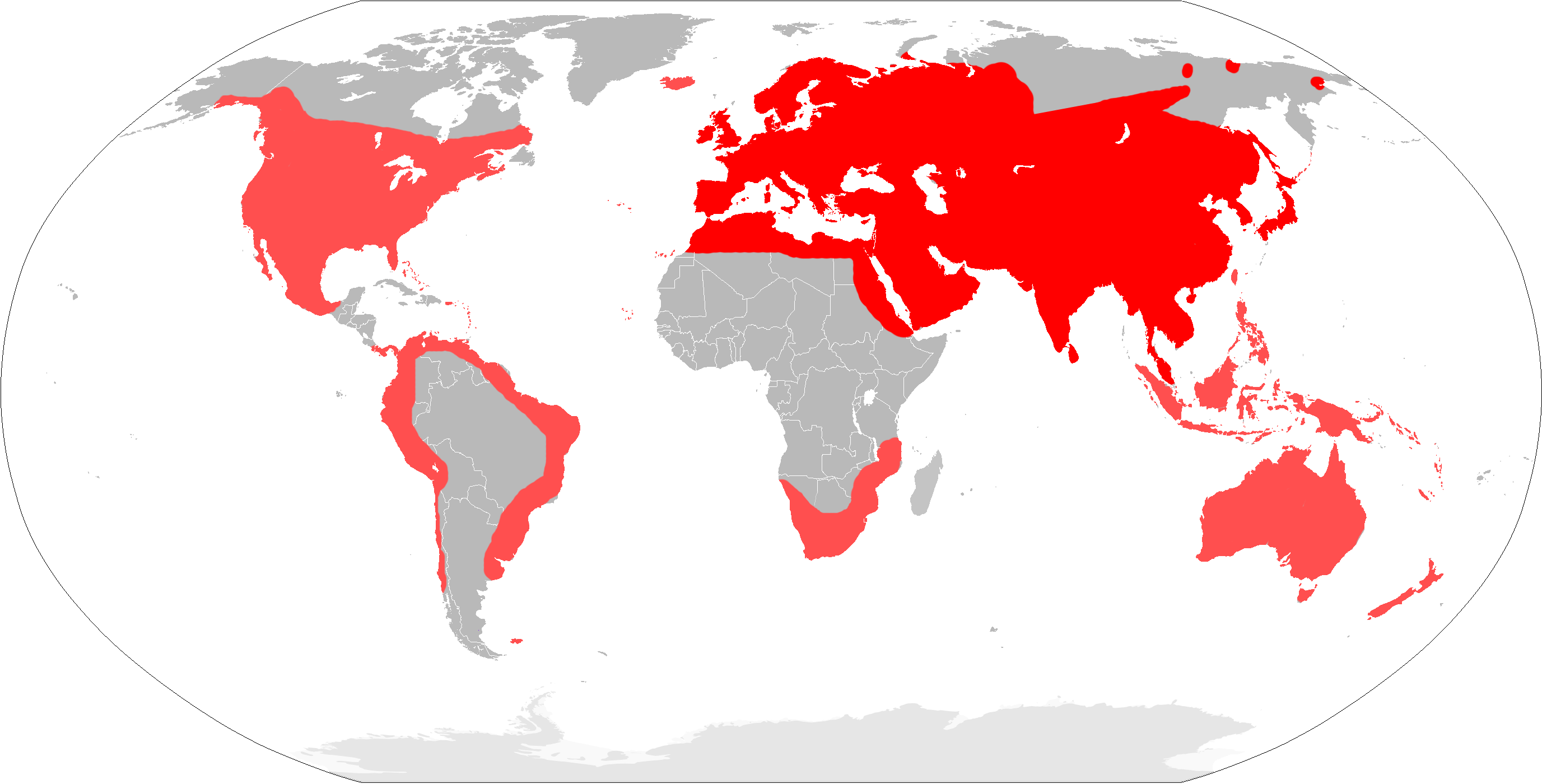
- House mouse range (note: distribution is incomplete)

Synonyms
- Mus abbotti

= House mouse =

Most common species of mice

The house mouse (Mus musculus) is a small mammal of the rodent family Muridae, characteristically having a pointed snout, large rounded ears, and a long and almost hairless tail. It is one of the most abundant species of the genus Mus. Although a wild animal, the house mouse has benefited significantly from associating with human habitation to the point that truly wild populations are significantly less common than the synanthropic populations near human activity.

The house mouse has been domesticated as the pet or fancy mouse, and as the laboratory mouse, which is one of the most important model organisms in biology and medicine. The complete mouse reference genome was sequenced in 2002.

== Characteristics ==
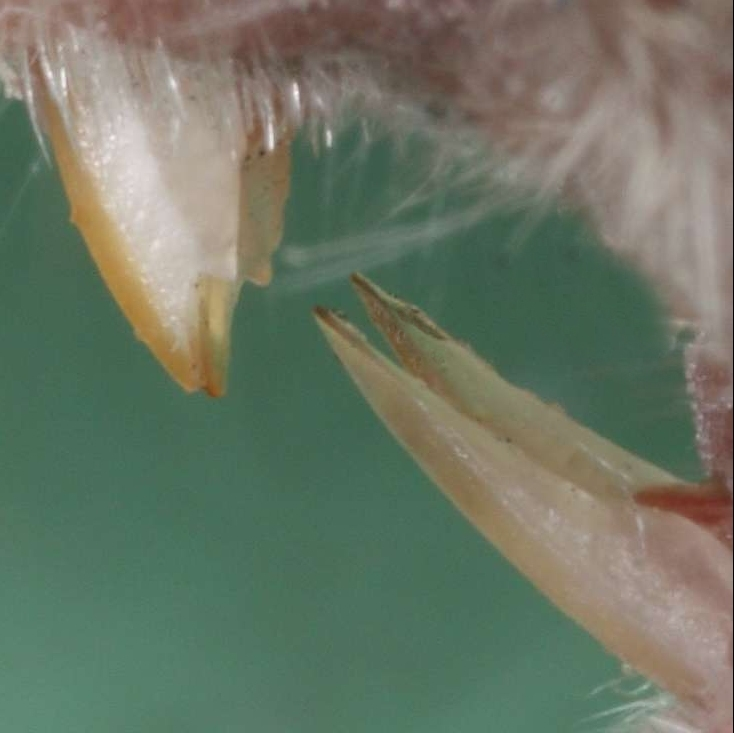
The house mouse is best identified by the sharp notch in its upper front teeth.

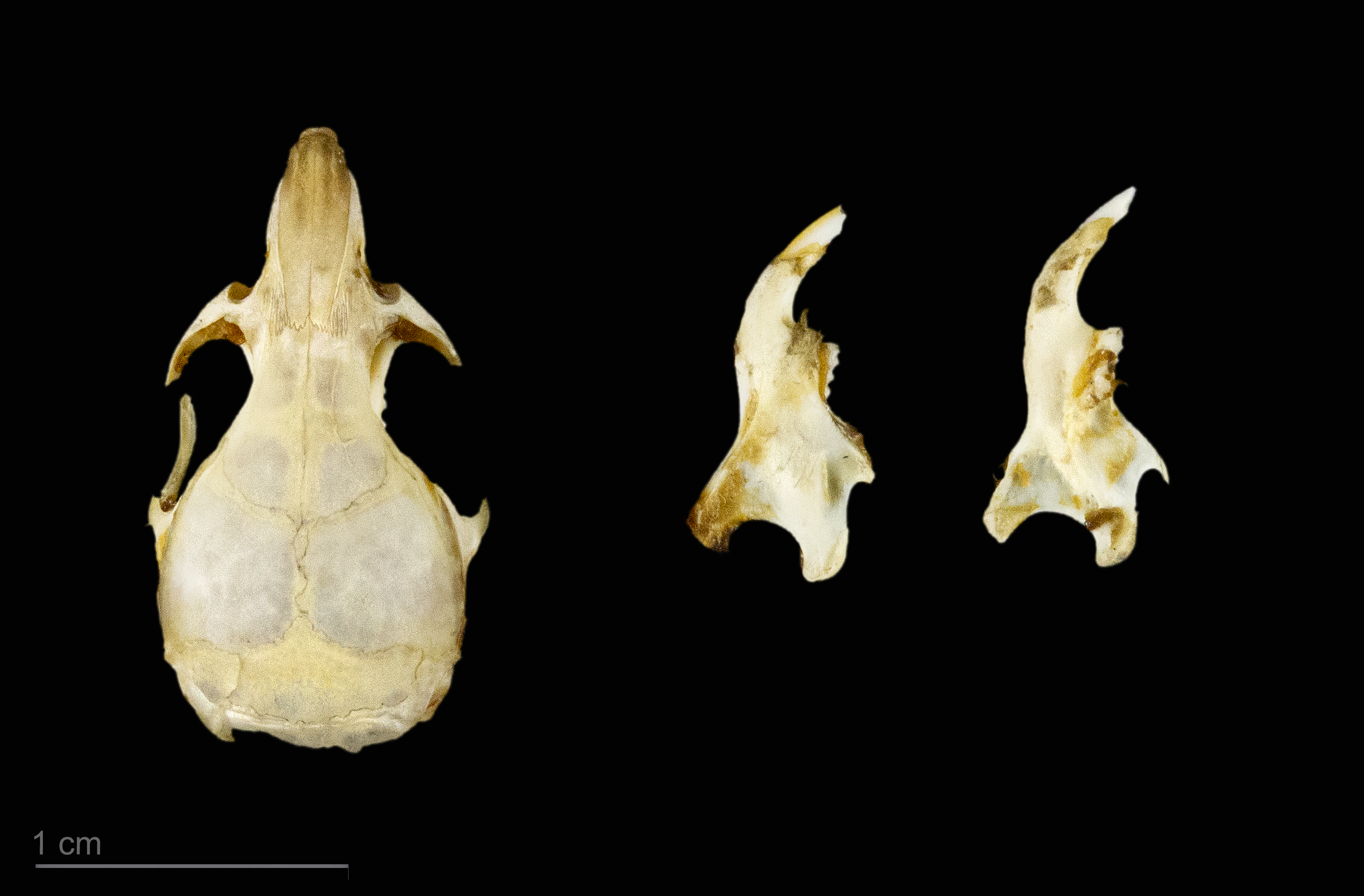
Skull of Mus musculus - MHNT

House mice have an adult body length (nose to base of tail) of 7.5–10 centimetres (3–4 in) and a tail length of 5–10 cm (2–4 in). The weight is typically 11–30 g (3/8–1 oz). In the wild they vary in color from grey and light brown to black (individual hairs are actually agouti coloured), but domesticated fancy mice and laboratory mice are produced in many colors ranging from white through champagne to pink. They have short hair and some, but not all, sub-species have a light belly. The ears and tail have little hair. The hind feet are short compared to Apodemus mice, only 15–19 mm (9/16–3/4 in) long; the normal gait is a run with a stride of about 4.5 cm (1 3/4 in), though they can jump vertically up to 45 cm (18 in). The voice is a high-pitched squeak. House mice thrive under a variety of conditions; they are found in and around homes and commercial structures, as well as in open fields and agricultural lands.

Newborn males and females can be distinguished on close examination as the anogenital distance in males is about double that of the female. From the age of about ten days, females have five pairs of mammary glands and nipples; males have no nipples. When sexually mature, the most striking and obvious difference is the presence of testicles on the males. These are large compared to the rest of the body and can be retracted into the body.

The tail, which is used for balance, has only a thin covering of hair as it is the main peripheral organ of heat loss in thermoregulation along with—to a lesser extent—the hairless parts of the paws and ears. Blood flow to the tail can be precisely controlled in response to changes in ambient temperature using a system of arteriovenous anastomoses to increase the temperature of the skin on the tail by as much as 10 °C (18 °F) to lose body heat. Tail length varies according to the environmental temperature of the mouse during postnatal development, so mice living in colder regions tend to have shorter tails. The tail is used for balance when the mouse is climbing or running, or as a base when the animal stands on its hind legs (tripoding), and to convey information about the dominance status of an individual in encounters with other mice.

In addition to the regular pea-sized thymus organ in the chest, house mice have a second functional pinhead-sized thymus organ in the neck next to the trachea.

== Taxonomy and subspecies ==
- Euarchontoglires
  - Glires
    - Rodentia (rodents)
    - Lagomorpha (rabbits, hares, pikas)
  - Euarchonta
    - Scandentia (treeshrews)
    - Primatomorpha
      - Dermoptera (flying lemurs)
      - - Primates (†Plesiadapiformes, Strepsirrhini, Haplorrhini)

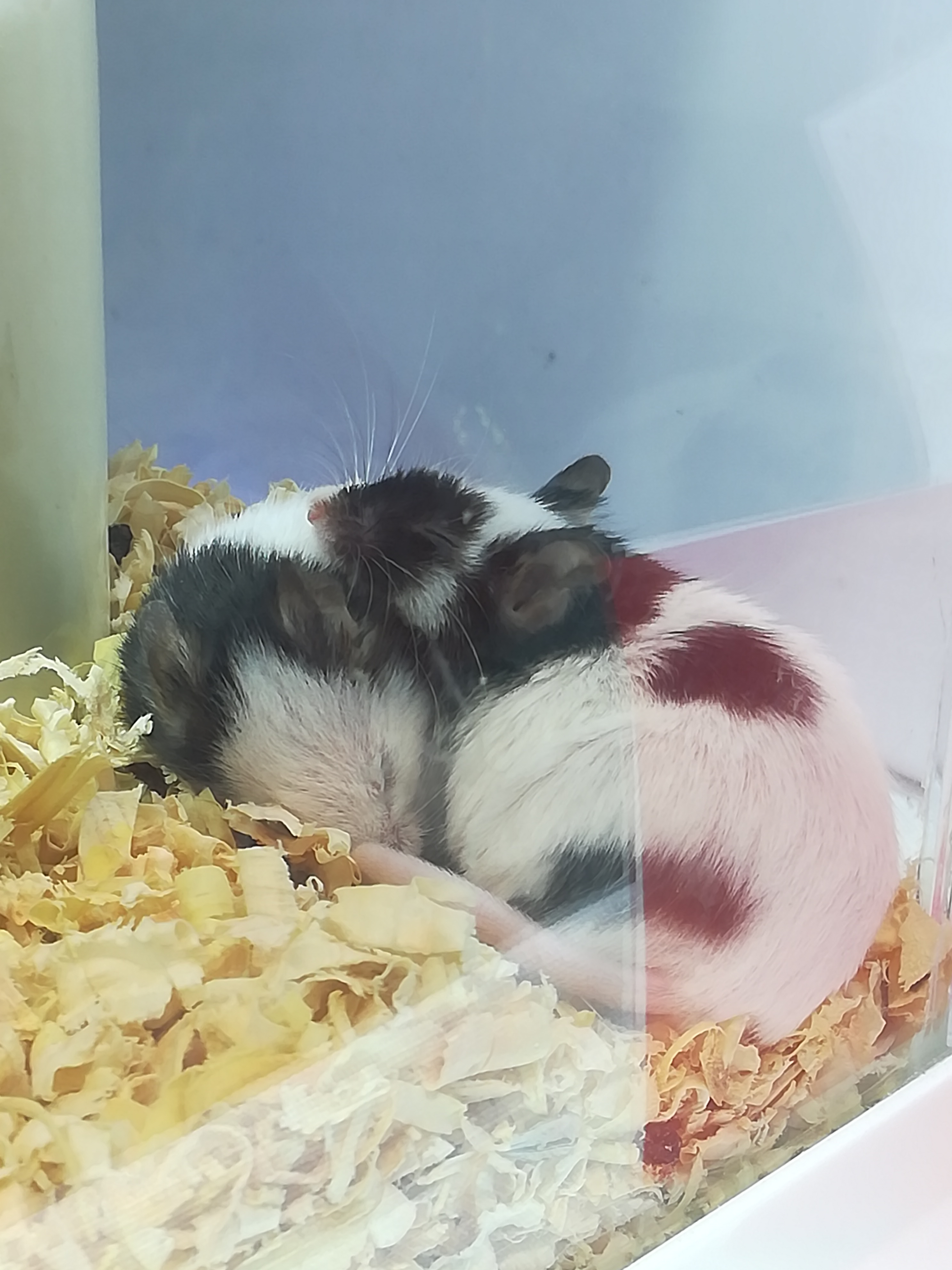
Japanese house mouse (M. m. molossinus)

Mice are boreoeutherian placental mammals of the Glires clade, which means they are amongst the closest relatives of humans other than lagomorphs, treeshrews, flying lemurs and other primates.

The three widely accepted subspecies are increasingly treated as distinct species by some:

- Southeastern Asian house mouse (M. m. castaneus) (southern and southeastern Asia)
- Western European house mouse (M. m. domesticus); includes the fancy mouse and the laboratory mouse (Western Europe, North America, South America, Africa and Oceania)
- Eastern European house mouse (M. m. musculus) (Eastern Europe and northern Asia)

Two additional subspecies have been recognized more recently:

- Southwestern Asian house mouse (M. m. bactrianus) (southwestern and Central Asia). However, due to significant genetic similarity observed between M. m. bactrianus and M. m. castaneus, the subspecies designation for M. m. bactrianus has now been questioned.
- Pygmy house mouse (M. m. gentilulus) (the Arabian Peninsula and Madagascar)

Many more subspecies' names have been given to house mice, but these are now regarded as synonyms of the five subspecies. Some populations are hybrids of different subspecies, including the Japanese house mouse (M. m. molossinus). A notable region of hybridization is a region in general Europe where M. m. domesticus and M. m. musculus are often found to hybridize. However, male hybrid mice typically experience hybrid sterility, which maintains reproductive separation between the two subspecies.

=== Chromosomal races ===
The standard species karyotype is composed of 40 chromosomes. Within Western Europe there are numerous populations – chromosomal races – with a reduced chromosome count arising from Robertsonian fusion.

== Evolution ==
Suzuki et al., 2013 confirms the theory that M. musculus originates in Southwestern Asia and identifies 5 subspecies and their origins: musculus in northern Eurasia, castaneus in India and Southeast Asia, a previously unknown subspecies from Nepal, domesticus in western Europe, and gentilulus in Yemen.

A recent study using 89 whole-genome sequences revealed that the modern day M. m. castaneus emerged from an ancestral M. musculus population in Indian subcontinent some time around 700 kya. From there, this ancestral population migrated to Iran around 360 kya to form M. m. domesticus and then to Afghanistan around 260 kya to form M. m. musculus.

== Behavior ==
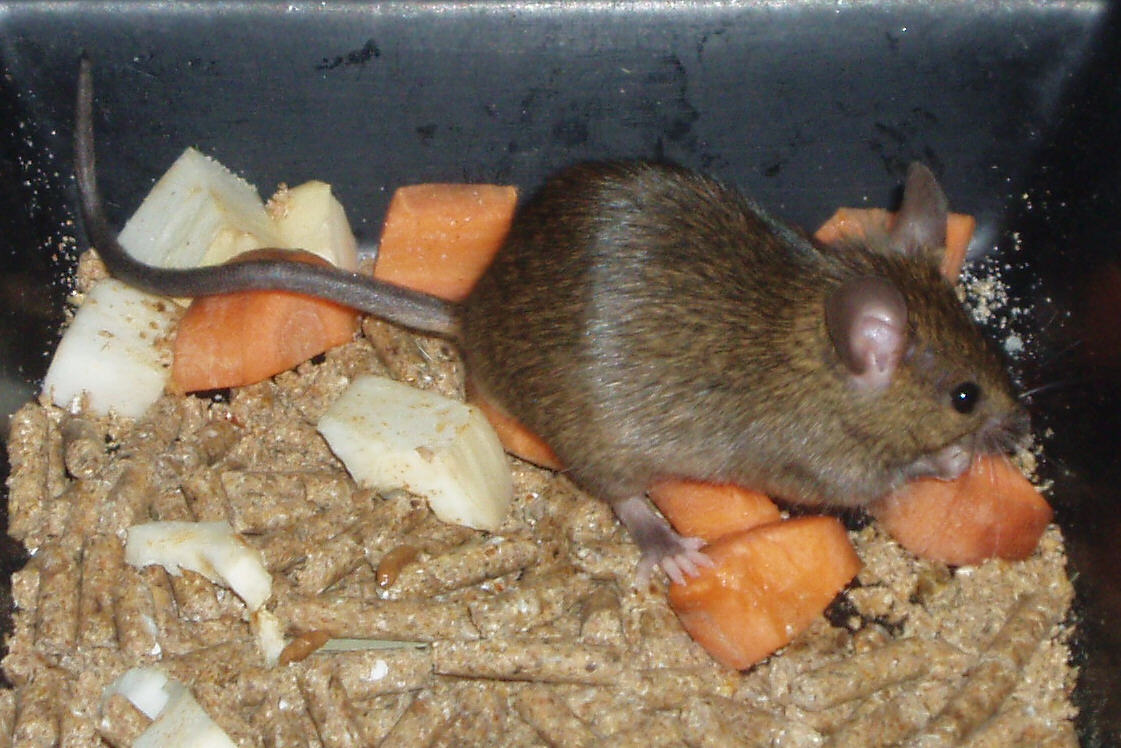
A house mouse feeding

House mice usually run, walk, or stand on all fours, but when eating, fighting, or orienting themselves, they rear up on their hind legs with additional support from the tail – a behavior known as "tripoding". Mice are good jumpers, climbers, and swimmers, and are generally considered to be thigmotactic.

Mice are mostly crepuscular or nocturnal and are averse to bright lights. The average sleep time of a captive house mouse is reported to be 12.5 hours per day. They live in a wide variety of hidden places near food sources, and construct nests from various soft materials. Mice are territorial, and one dominant male usually lives together with several females and young mice. Dominant males respect each other's territories, normally entering another's territory only if it is vacant. If two or more males are housed together in a cage, they often become aggressive unless they have been raised together from birth.

House mice primarily feed on plant matter, but are omnivorous. They eat their own faeces to acquire nutrients produced by bacteria in their intestines. House mice, like most other rodents, can not vomit.

Mice are generally afraid of rats, which often kill and eat them (muricide). Despite this, free-living populations of rats and mice do exist together in forest areas in New Zealand, North America, and elsewhere. House mice are generally poor competitors and in most areas cannot survive away from human settlements in areas where other small mammals, such as wood mice, are present. However, in some areas (such as Australia), mice are able to coexist with other small rodent species.

== Social behavior ==
The social behavior of the house mouse is not rigidly fixed into species-specific patterns but is instead adaptable to the environmental conditions, such as the availability of food and space. This adaptability allows house mice to inhabit diverse areas ranging from sandy dunes to apartment buildings.

House mice have two forms of social behaviour, the expression of which depends on the environmental context. House mice in buildings and other urbanized areas with close proximity to humans are known as commensal. Commensal mice populations often have an excessive food source resulting in high population densities and small home ranges. This causes a switch from territorial behaviour to a hierarchy of individuals. When populations have an excess of food, there is less aggression between females, which usually occurs to gain access to food or to prevent infanticide. Aggression between males occurs in commensal populations, mainly to defend female mates and protect a small territory. The high level of male-to-male aggression, with a low female-to-female aggression level is common in polygamous populations. The social unit of commensal house mouse populations generally consists of one male and two or more females, usually related. These groups breed cooperatively, with the females communally nursing. This cooperative breeding and rearing by related females helps increase reproductive success. When there are no related females breeding groups can form from non-related females.

In open areas such as shrubs and fields, the house mouse population is known as noncommensal. These populations are often limited by water or food supply and have large territories. Female-female aggression in the noncommensal house mouse populations is much higher, reaching a level generally attributed to free-ranging species. Male aggression is also higher in noncommensal populations. In commensal populations, males come into contact with other males quite frequently due to high population densities and aggression must be mediated or the risk of injury becomes too great.

Both commensal and noncommensal house mouse males aggressively defend their territory and act to exclude all intruders. Males mark their territory by scent marking with urine. In marked territories, intruders showed significantly lower aggression than the territory residents. House mice show a male-biased dispersal; males generally leave their birth sites and migrate to form new territories whereas females generally stay and are opportunistic rather than seasonal breeders.

== Senses and communication ==
=== Vision ===
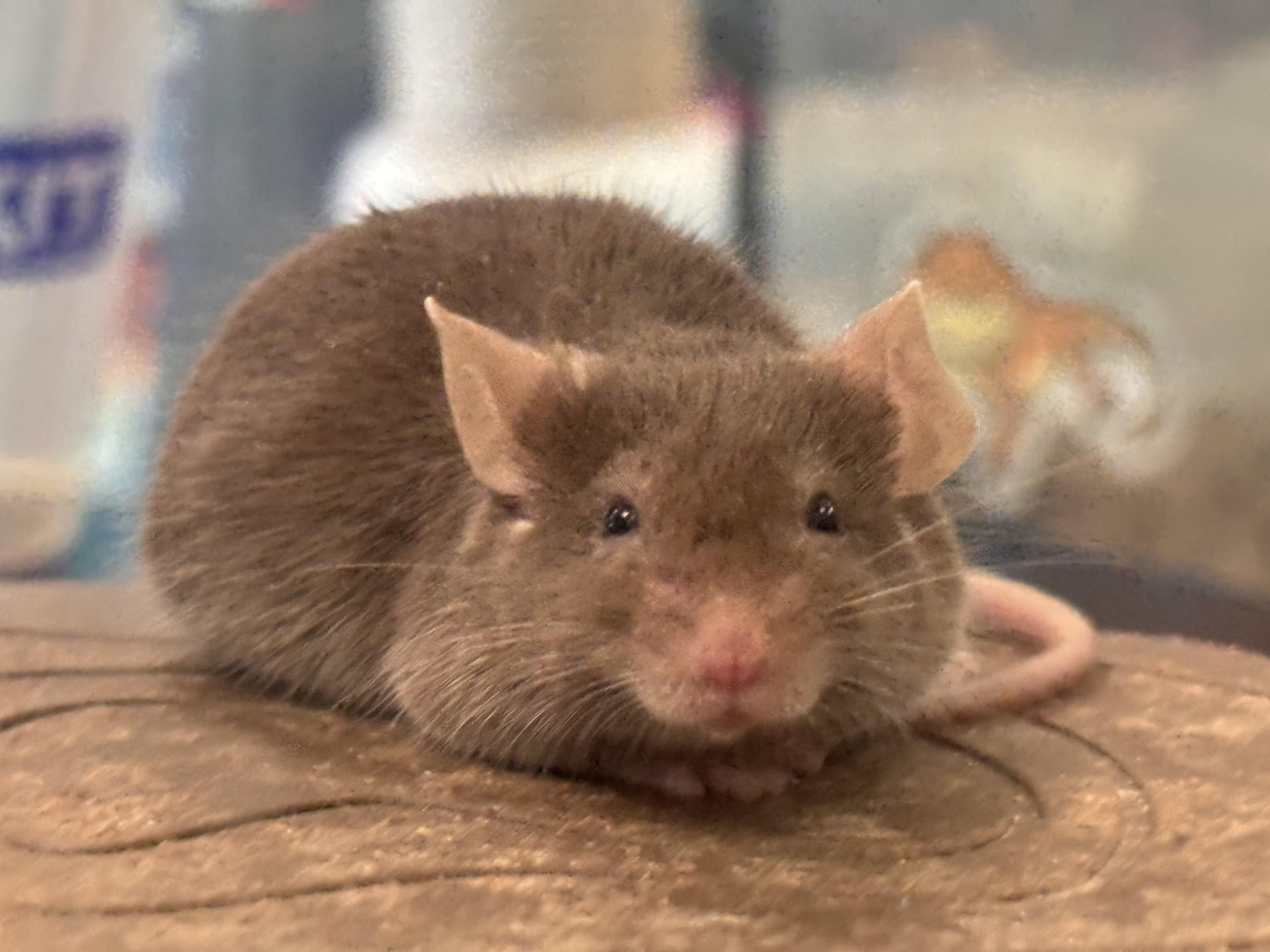
An adult house mouse

The visual apparatus of mice is basically similar to that of humans but differs in that they are dichromats and have only two types of cone cells whereas humans are trichromats and have three. This means that mice do not perceive some of the colors in the human visual spectrum. However, the ventral area of the mouse retina has a much greater density of ultraviolet-sensitive cones than other areas of the retina, although the biological significance of this structure is unknown. In 2007, mice genetically engineered to produce the third type of cone were shown to be able to distinguish a range of colors similar to that perceived by tetrachromats.

=== Olfaction ===
House mice also rely on pheromones for social communication, some of which are produced by the preputial glands of both sexes. The tear fluid and urine of male mice also contains pheromones, such as major urinary proteins. Mice detect pheromones mainly with the vomeronasal organ (Jacobson's organ), located at the bottom of the nose.

The urine of house mice, especially that of males, has a characteristic strong odor. At least 10 different compounds, such as alkanes, alcohols, etc., are detectable in the urine. Among them, five compounds are specific to males, namely 3-cyclohexene-1-methanol, aminotriazole (3-amino-s-triazole), 4-ethyl phenol, 3-ethyl-2,7-dimethyl octane and 1-iodoundecane.

Odours from adult males or from pregnant or lactating females can speed up or retard sexual maturation in juvenile females and synchronise reproductive cycles in mature females (i.e. the Whitten effect). Odours of unfamiliar male mice may terminate pregnancies, i.e. the Bruce effect.

=== Tactile ===
Mice can sense surfaces and air movements with their whiskers which are also used during thigmotaxis. If mice are blind from birth, super-normal growth of the vibrissae occurs presumably as a compensatory response. Conversely, if the vibrissae are absent, the use of vision is intensified.

== Life cycle and reproduction ==
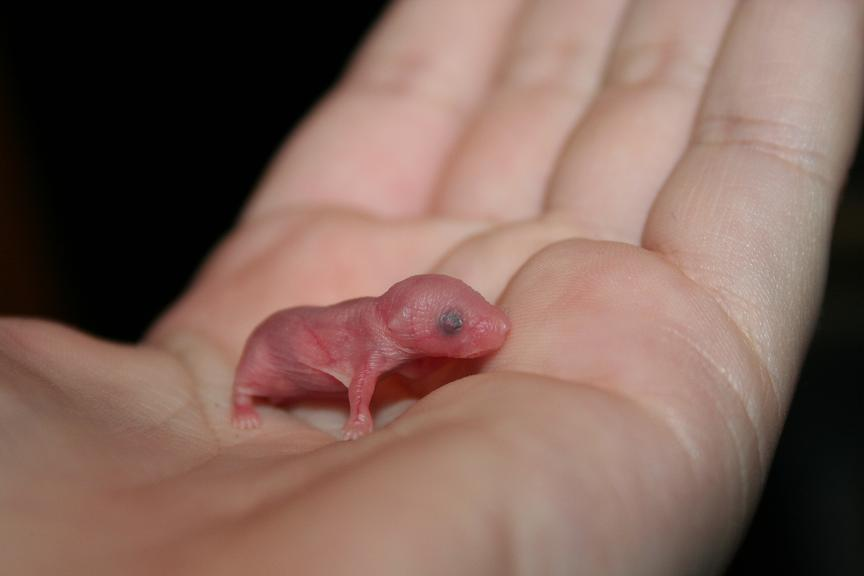
A newborn mouse

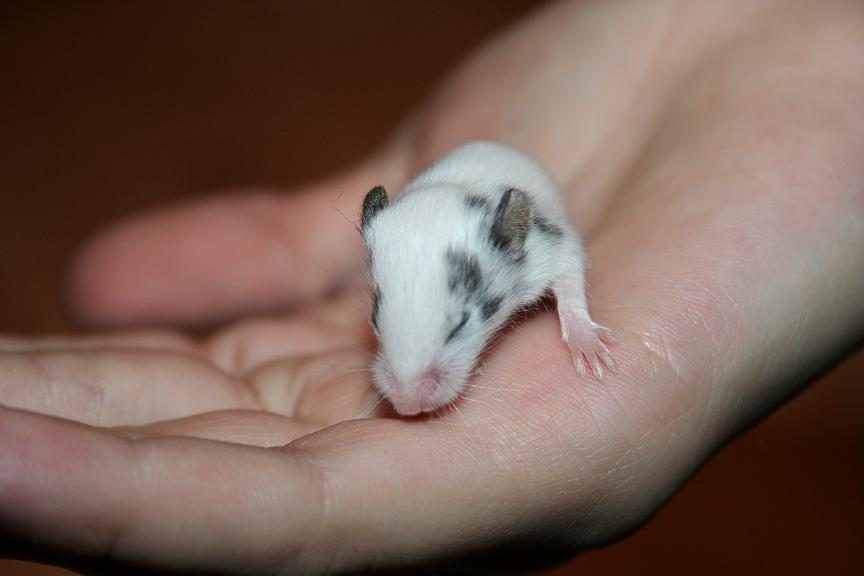
A two-week-old fancy mouse, just about to open its eyes

Female house mice have an estrous cycle about four to six days long, with estrus itself lasting less than a day. If several females are held together under crowded conditions, they will often not have an estrus at all. If they are then exposed to male urine, they will come into estrus after 72 hours.

Male house mice court females by emitting characteristic ultrasonic calls in the 30 kHz–110 kHz range. The calls are most frequent during courtship when the male is sniffing and following the female; however, the calls continue after mating has begun, at which time the calls are coincident with mounting behaviour. Males can be induced to emit these calls by female pheromones. The vocalizations appear to differ between individuals and have been compared to bird songs because of their complexity. While females have the capability to produce ultrasonic calls, they typically do not do so during mating behaviour.

Following copulation, female mice will normally develop a mating plug which prevents further copulation. The plug is not necessary for pregnancy initiation, as this will also occur without the plug. The presence or absence of the plug will not affect litter size either. This plug stays in place for some 24 hours. The gestation period is about 19–21 days, and they give birth to a litter of 3–14 young (average six to eight). One female can have 5 to 10 litters per year, so the mouse population can increase very quickly. Breeding occurs throughout the year. (However, animals living in the wild do not reproduce in the colder months, even though they do not hibernate.)

The pups are born blind and without fur or ears. The ears are fully developed by the fourth day, fur begins to appear at about six days and the eyes open around 13 days after birth; the pups are weaned at around 21 days. Females reach sexual maturity at about six weeks of age and males at about eight weeks, but both can copulate as early as five weeks.

=== Polygamy ===
Although house mice can be either monogamous or polygamous, they are most commonly polygamous. They generally show characteristics of mate-defense polygyny in that males are highly territorial and protective of their mates, while females are less agonistic. The communal nursing groups that result from these behaviors lead to lower numbers of infanticide since more females are able to protect greater numbers of offspring.

==== Evolutionary and behavioural consequences ====
Both evolutionary and behavioral consequences result from the polygamous nature of the house mouse. One consequence is the paternal investment, which is lower in polygamous mice than in mice that are monogamous. This occurs due to the fact that males spend more time involved in sexual competition than do females, leaving less time for paternal care. Polygamous male house mice spend less time alone with pups. They are also less likely and slower to retrieve lost pups than males of monogamous mice. In contrast, the maternal investment is similar between female mice that have mated once versus multiply.

The polygamous behavior of female house mice promotes sperm competition, which affects both male and female evolutionary fitness. Females who mate with multiple males tend to produce both pups in greater numbers, and with higher survival rates, increasing female fitness. Sperm competition that arises from polygamy favors males with faster, more motile sperm in higher numbers, increasing male fitness. The competitive aspect of insemination increases the frequency of polyandrous events and fertilizations. Polyandry has evolved to increase reproductive success. Male mating behavior is also affected in response to the practice of polygamous behavior. Compared to monogamous house mice, polygamous house mice mate for longer periods of time. This behaviour allows for an increase in both the transfer of sperm and paternity success, which in turn increases male fitness.

=== Polyandry ===
As opposed to polygyny, polyandrous behavior in females is the act of breeding with several males in the same season. Variation in number of males that females mate with occurs among a population. Polyandrous behavior is a common mating pattern in the subspecies M. m. musculus as well as its relative M. m. domesticus.

Polyandry occurs in 30% of all wild populations of house mice. Litters from multiple sires tend to be more genetically diverse than litters of single sires. Multiple paternity is also more common in larger populations than smaller populations, because there is a larger number of mates and more diverse mates to choose from. Within a population, males and females show different levels of multiple mating. Females show bias toward unrelated males rather than related males during sexual selection, resulting in more genetically diverse offspring and a reduction of inbreeding depression. Inbreeding depression increases genetic incompatibilities, levels of homozygosity, and the chance of expression of deleterious recessive alleles. Polyandry has been shown to increase offspring survival compared to monandry.

==== Evolutionary consequences ====
The fitness of females increases in polyandrous lines due to more genetic diversity and greater litter size.

Due to polyandry, males can be confused by the identity of new offspring. Multiple mating by females and paternity confusion can decrease rates of infanticide. If the males are uncertain if the offspring are theirs, they are less likely to kill the offspring.

Intrauterine insemination causes an evolutionary consequence resulting from polyandrous behavior. When multiple males mate with one female, there are multiple sets of sperm gametes in a female mouse. Offspring fertilized by multiple males can compete more strongly for mother's resources and can lead to a decrease in body size and variation in body size.

=== Inbreeding avoidance ===
Since inbreeding is detrimental, it tends to be avoided. In the house mouse, the major urinary protein (MUP) gene cluster provides a highly polymorphic scent signal of genetic identity that appears to underlie kin recognition and inbreeding avoidance. Thus there are fewer matings between mice sharing MUP haplotypes than would be expected if there were random mating. Another mechanism for avoiding inbreeding is evident when a female house mouse mates with multiple males. In such a case, there appears to be egg-driven sperm selection against sperm from related males.

== Genetics ==
As a model organism, a great deal is known about mouse genetics, with a major tool being the knockout mouse technique.

== Life expectancy ==
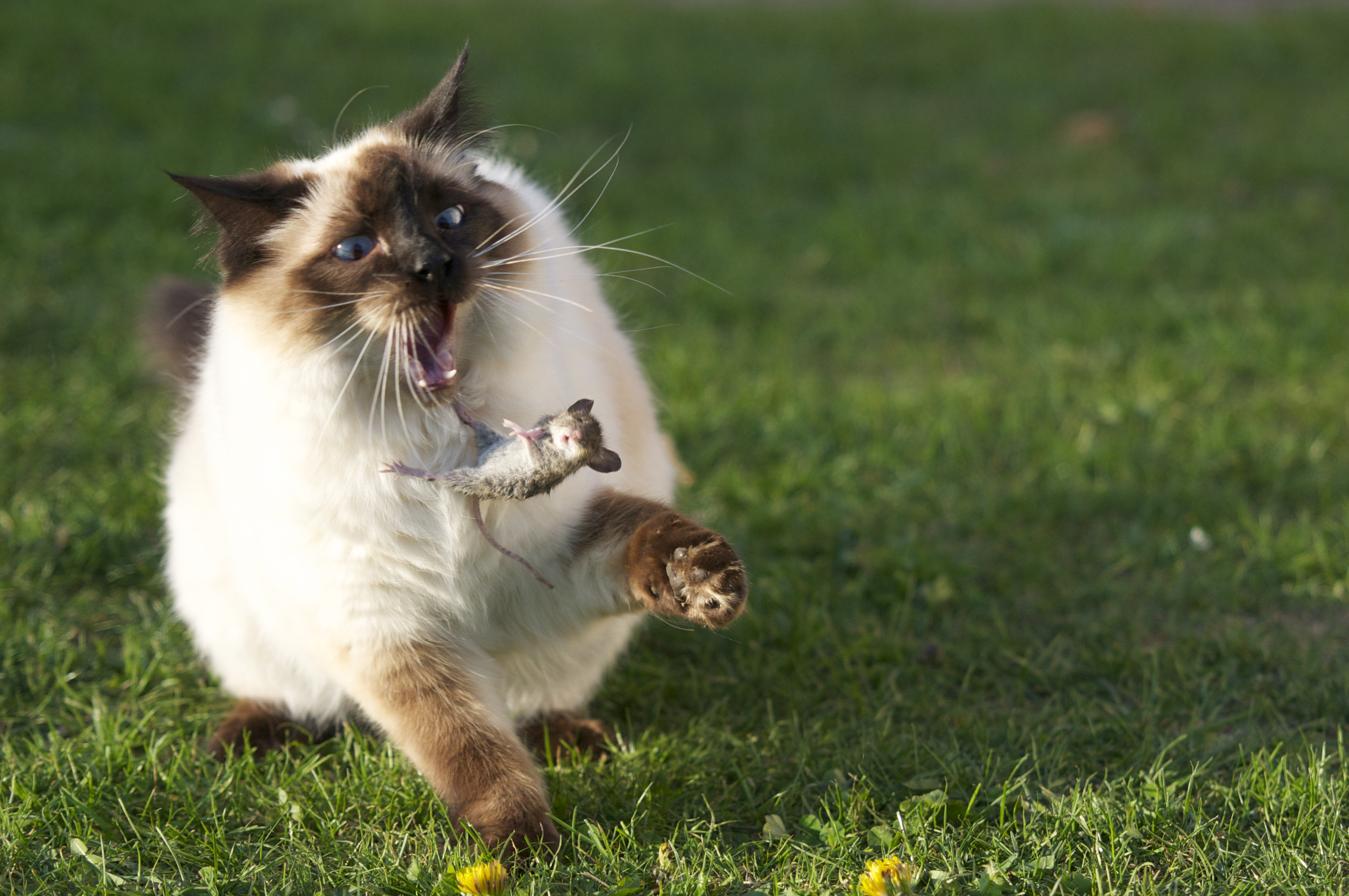
In both agricultural and urban environments house mice are often preyed upon by the domestic cat, as with this ragdoll, seen here playing with a mouse it has caught.

House mice usually live less than one year in the wild, due to a high level of predation and exposure to harsh environments. In protected environments, however, they often live two to three years. The Methuselah Mouse Prize is a competition to breed or engineer extremely long-lived laboratory mice. As of 2005, the record holder was a genetically engineered mouse that lived for 1,819 days (7 days short of 5 years). Another record holder that was kept in an enriched environment but did not receive any genetic, pharmacological, or dietary treatment lived for 1,551 days (4 years, 90 days).

== Aging ==
In several different mouse strains, with age, nuclear DNA from the liver, heart, brain, kidney, skeletal muscle and spleen showed significantly higher levels of 8-Oxo-2'-deoxyguanosine (8-oxo-dG), a direct marker of DNA damage. This increase was attributed to an increase in sensitivity of these tissues to oxidative stress. Caloric restriction is known to increase the lifespan of rodents and to reduce aging. A study conducted with mice undergoing dietary restriction was found to significantly reduce the age-related accumulation of 8-oxo-dG levels in all tissues studied when compared with a control. Thus, it has been suggested that oxidative DNA damage as a result of normal cellular metabolism could be a highly relevant factor of aging. In another study, two forms of DNA damage (8-hydroxy-2'-deoxyguanosine and DNA-protein crosslinks) were also found to increase with age in mouse brain and liver tissues.

== Mice and humans ==
=== History ===
House mice usually live in proximity to humans, in or around houses and/or fields. They are native to India, and later they spread to the eastern Mediterranean about 13,000 BC, only spreading into the rest of Europe around 1000 BC. This time lag is thought to be because the mice require agrarian human settlements above a certain size. The house mouse first arrived in the Americas in the early sixteenth century. It was carried aboard on the ships of Spanish explorers and Conquistadors. About one hundred years later, it arrived in North America with French fur traders and English colonists. They have since been spread to all parts of the globe by humans.

Many studies have been done on mouse phylogenies to reconstruct early human movements. For example, one study suggests the possibility of a previously unsuspected early link between Northern Europe and Madeira on the basis of the origin of Madeiran mice. House mice were thought to be the primary reason for the domestication of cats.

=== As pets ===
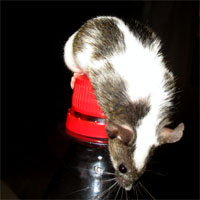
Fancy mice may be of colours and/or have markings not found in wild mice

The first written reference to mice kept as pets occurs in the Erya, the oldest extant Chinese dictionary, from a mention in an 1100 BC version. Human domestication led to numerous strains of "fancy" or hobby mice with a variety of colours and a docile temperament. Domestic varieties of the house mouse are bred as a food source for some carnivorous pet reptiles, birds, arthropods, and fish. The effects of domestication can be rapid, with captive-reared mice differing in boldness and activity patterns compared to wild-caught mice after 4–5 generations in recent research.

=== As pests ===
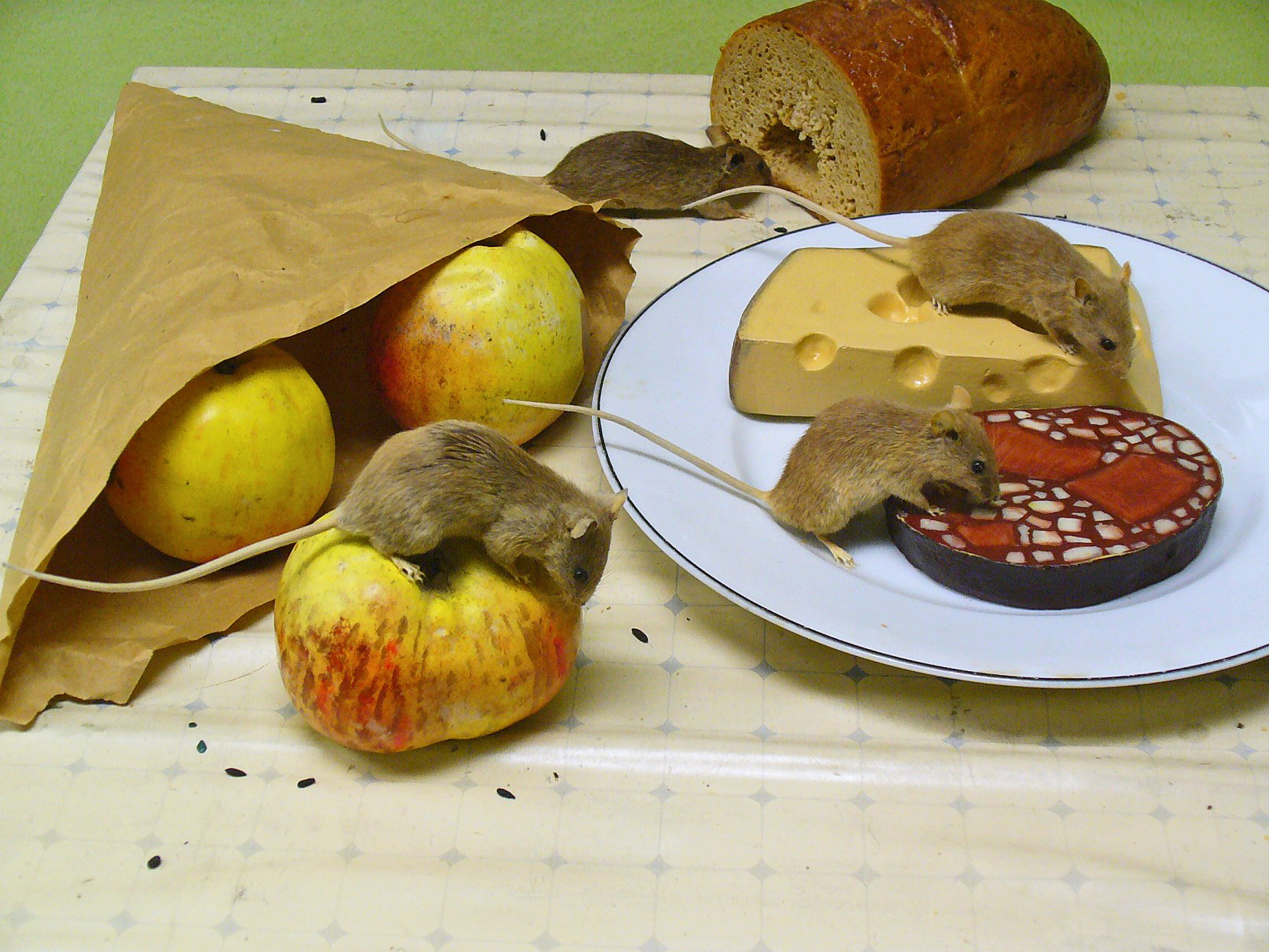
Infestation of mice. Taxidermy display, Staatliches Museum für Naturkunde Karlsruhe, Germany.

Mice are widespread pest organisms, and one of the most common rodents to infest human buildings. They commonly forage outdoors during the spring and summer, but retreat into buildings through the autumn and winter to seek warmth and food. They typically feed on unattended food, leftovers and garden produce. Their foraging risks the contamination and degradation of food supplies, and can also spread other pests such as fleas, ticks, lice and mites.

When infesting homes, house mice may pose a risk of damaging and compromising the structure of furniture and the building itself. They gnaw various materials to file down their growing teeth and keep the length under control. Common damage includes gnawed electrical wires, marks on wooden furniture and construction supporting elements, and textile damage.

=== Disease vectors ===
House mice can transmit diseases, contaminate food, and damage food packaging. The US Centers for Disease Control and Prevention provides a list of diseases transmitted by all rodents, a few of which are transmitted through the house mouse.

Lymphocytic choriomeningitis (LCMV) can be transmitted by mice, but is not commonly reported in humans. Most human infections are mild and are often never diagnosed. There are concerns that women infected with LCMV during pregnancy are at risk.

House mice are not usually a vector of bubonic plague (Black Death) because they have fewer infestations with fleas than do rats, and because the fleas which house mice normally carry exhibit little tendency to bite humans rather than their natural host.

Rickettsialpox, caused by the bacterium Rickettsia akari and similar to chickenpox, is spread by mice in general, but is very rare and generally mild and resolves within two or three weeks if untreated. No known deaths have resulted from the disease. Murine typhus (also called endemic typhus), caused by the bacterium Rickettsia typhi, is transmitted by the fleas that infest rats. While rat fleas are the most common vectors, cat fleas and mouse fleas are less common modes of transmission. Endemic typhus is highly treatable with antibiotics. The U.S. CDC currently does not mention rickettsialpox or murine typhus on its website about diseases directly transmitted by rodents in general.

Leptospirosis is carried by a variety of wild and domestic animals including dogs, rats, swine, cattle, mice in general, and can be transmitted by the urine of an infected animal and is contagious as long as the urine is still moist.

In Central Europe, the Dobrava sequence of hantavirus has been found in house mice.

Mice play a role in the ecological cycle of Lyme disease by acting as hosts for tick larvae, thereby contributing indirectly to transmission. When young ticks feed on infected mice, they acquire the bacteria responsible for the disease; as the ticks mature, they can transmit the infection to humans and other animals through bites.

=== Invasive species ===
Mice have become an invasive species on islands to where they have spread during the period of European exploration and colonisation.

New Zealand had no land mammals other than two species of bat, though several marsupials, prior to human occupation, and the house mouse is one of many mammalian species that have been introduced. Mice are responsible for a reduction in native bird species since they eat some of the same foods as birds. They are also known to kill lizards and have a large effect on native insects.

Gough Island in the South Atlantic is used by 20 species of seabirds for breeding, including almost all of the world's Tristan albatross (Diomedea dabbenena) and Atlantic petrel (Pterodroma incerta). Until house mice arrived on the island in the 19th century with sailors, the birds did not have any mammalian predators. The mice have since grown unusually large and have learned to attack albatross chicks, which can be 90 cm tall, but are largely immobile, by working in groups and gnawing on them until they bleed to death.

In the grain belt of southeastern Australia, the introduced subspecies M. m. domesticus breed so successfully, every three years or so they reach plague proportions, achieving densities of 1000 per hectare and causing massive disruption to communities, and losses to agriculture of A$36 million annually.

=== As a model organism ===
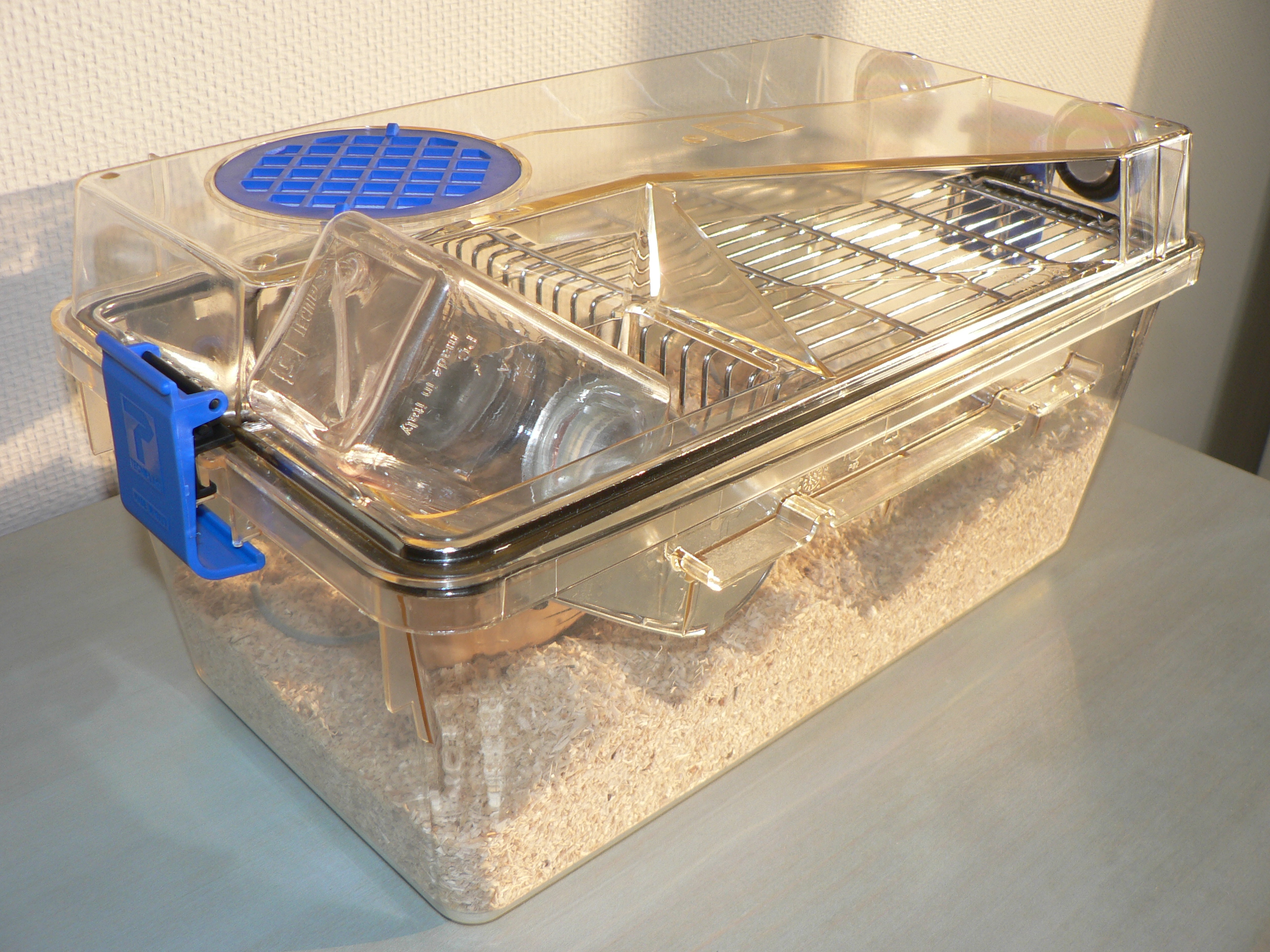
An individually ventilated and sealed cage for laboratory mice

Mice are the most commonly used mammalian laboratory animal, due to their relatively close relationship, and associated high homology, with humans, their ease in maintenance and handling, and their high rate of reproduction. Laboratory mice typically belong to standardized inbred strains selected for the stability or clarity of specific harmful mutations. This allows research with laboratory mice to easily restrict genetic and biological variables, making them very useful model organisms in genetic and medicinal research. Mice have been used in scientific research since the 1650s.

=== In folk culture ===
Importance of mice as a house and agricultural pest resulted in a development of a variety of mouse-related rituals and stories in world's cultures. The Ancient Egyptians had a story about "The mouse as vizier".

Many South Slavs had a traditional annual "Mouse Day" celebration. In the eastern Balkans (most of Bulgaria, North Macedonia, the Torlak districts of Serbia), the "Mouse Day" (Bulgarian: Миши ден, Мишин ден) was celebrated on 9 October of the Julian calendar (corresponds to 27 October of the Gregorian calendar in the 20th and 21st centuries), the next day after the feast of Saint Demetrius. In the western Balkans (Bosnia, Croatia), the Mouse Day would usually be celebrated in the spring, during the Maslenitsa week or early in the Lent.

== See also ==
- Woolly mouse
- Myobia musculi, common mite found in fur of house mouse
