= R. palustris =

R. palustris may refer to:

- Radfordia palustris, a species of mite in the subgenus Hesperomyobia of the genus Radfordia.
- Rhodopseudomonas palustris, a gram-negative purple non-sulfur bacteria, notable for its ability to switch between four different modes of metabolism.
- Rorippa palustris is a flowering plant species in the mustard family known by the common names bog yellowcress and marsh cress.
- Rosa palustris (swamp rose), a shrub in the rose family native to much of eastern North America.
