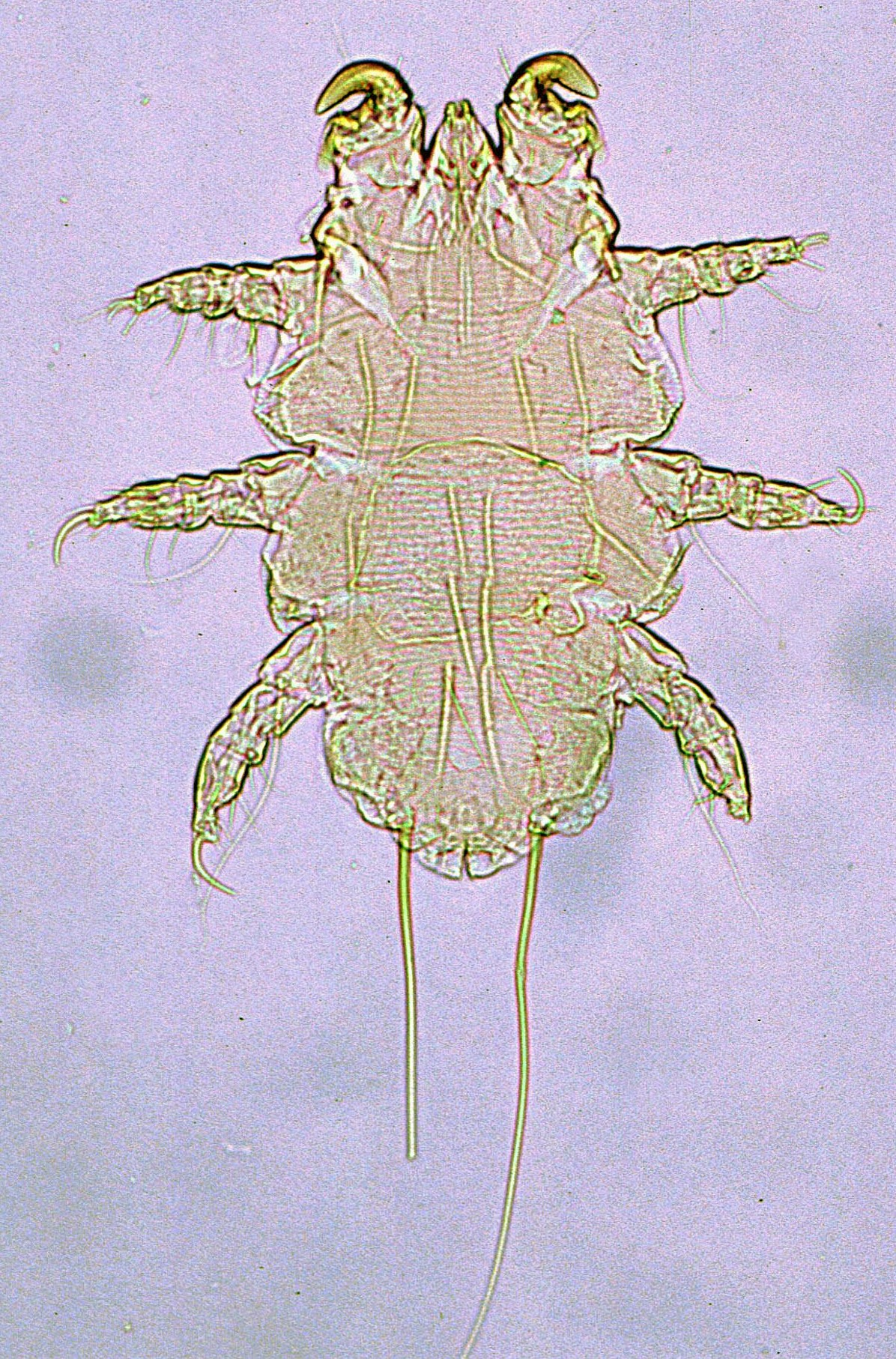

Scientific classification
- Domain: Eukaryota
- Kingdom: Animalia
- Phylum: Arthropoda
- Subphylum: Chelicerata
- Class: Arachnida
- Order: Trombidiformes
- Family: Myobiidae
- Genus: Myobia
- Species: M. musculi

Binomial name
- Myobia musculi (Schranck, 1781)

= Myobia musculi =

Species of mite

Myobia musculi is a type of fur mite which is found worldwide. It can infest mice and, rarely, other rodents. Like all mites the Myobia musculi mite has four pairs of legs but the first pair are very short, as an adaptation to grasping the hair shaft, giving the mite the appearance of having three pairs of legs. The second pair of legs end in empodia (claw-like structures). Adult mites are approximately 160–180 μm wide; females are 400–500 μm long, and males are 280–320 μm long.

The lifecycle of M. musculi takes 23 days. Eggs are laid on a hair shaft, so hairless mice cannot become infested. The mites are generally found on the head, neck and shoulders of the mouse.
