= Domestic mouse =

Domestic mouse may refer to:

- Fancy mouse, domesticated mice kept as pets
- Laboratory mouse, domesticated mice used in scientific research

== See also ==
- Mus musculus domesticus, the subspecies of the house mouse native to western Europe
