= Radfordia palustris =

Scientific classification
- Kingdom: Animalia
- Phylum: Arthropoda
- Subphylum: Chelicerata
- Class: Arachnida
- Order: Trombidiformes
- Family: Myobiidae
- Genus: Radfordia
- Species: R. palustris

Binomial name
- Radfordia palustris Fain and Lukoschus, 1977

Species of mite

Radfordia palustris is a species of mite in the subgenus Hesperomyobia of the genus Radfordia. It has been recorded on the marsh rice rat (Oryzomys palustris) in Florida, Georgia, and South Carolina.

== See also ==
- List of parasites of the marsh rice rat

== Literature cited ==
- Bochkov, A.V. 1996. Hesperomyobia (Acari: Myobiidae: Radfordia), a new subgenus of myobiid mites from rodents of the family Hesperomyidae (Rodentia). Acarina 4(1–2):39–42.
- Whitaker, J.O., Walters, B.L., Castor, L.K., Ritzi, C.M. and Wilson, N. 2007. Host and distribution lists of mites (Acari), parasitic and phoretic, in the hair or on the skin of North American wild mammals north of Mexico: records since 1974. Faculty Publications from the Harold W. Manter Laboratory of Parasitology, University of Nebraska, Lincoln 1:1–173.
