= Radfordia =

Scientific classification
- Kingdom: Animalia
- Phylum: Arthropoda
- Subphylum: Chelicerata
- Class: Arachnida
- Order: Trombidiformes
- Family: Myobiidae
- Genus: Radfordia; Ewing, 1938

Genus of mites

Radfordia is a genus of mites belonging to the family Myobiidae.

The genus has cosmopolitan distribution.

Species:

- Radfordia affinis (Poppe, 1896)
- Radfordia arvicolae Fain & Lukoschus, 1977
- Radfordia eliomys Fain & Lukoschus, 1973
- Radfordia ensifera (Poppe, 1896)
- Radfordia hata Uchikawa, Nakata & Takahashi, 1997
- Radfordia japonica Uchikawa, Nakata & Takahashi, 1997
- Radfordia lancearia (Poppe, 1908)
- Radfordia lemnina (Koch, 1841)
- Radfordia mikado Uchikawa, Nakata & Takahashi, 1997
- Radfordia mirabilis
- Radfordia palustris Fain & Lukoschus, 1977
- Radfordia zibethicalis (Radford, 1936)
