= Myobia =

Scientific classification
- Domain: Eukaryota
- Kingdom: Animalia
- Phylum: Arthropoda
- Subphylum: Chelicerata
- Class: Arachnida
- Order: Trombidiformes
- Family: Myobiidae
- Genus: Myobia; Heyden, 1826

Genus of mites

Myobia is a genus of mites that live in the fur of rodents, and contains the following species:

- Myobia agraria Gorissen & Lukoschus, 1982 – found on Apodemus agrarius
- Myobia annae Haitlinger, 1987 – found on Apodemus mystacinus
- Myobia apomyos Uchikawa, OConnor & Klompen, 1991 – found on Apomys littoralis
- Myobia malaysiensis Fain, Lukoschus & Nadchatram, 1980
- Myobia musculi (Schranck, 1781)
- Myobia machadoi Fain, 1972
