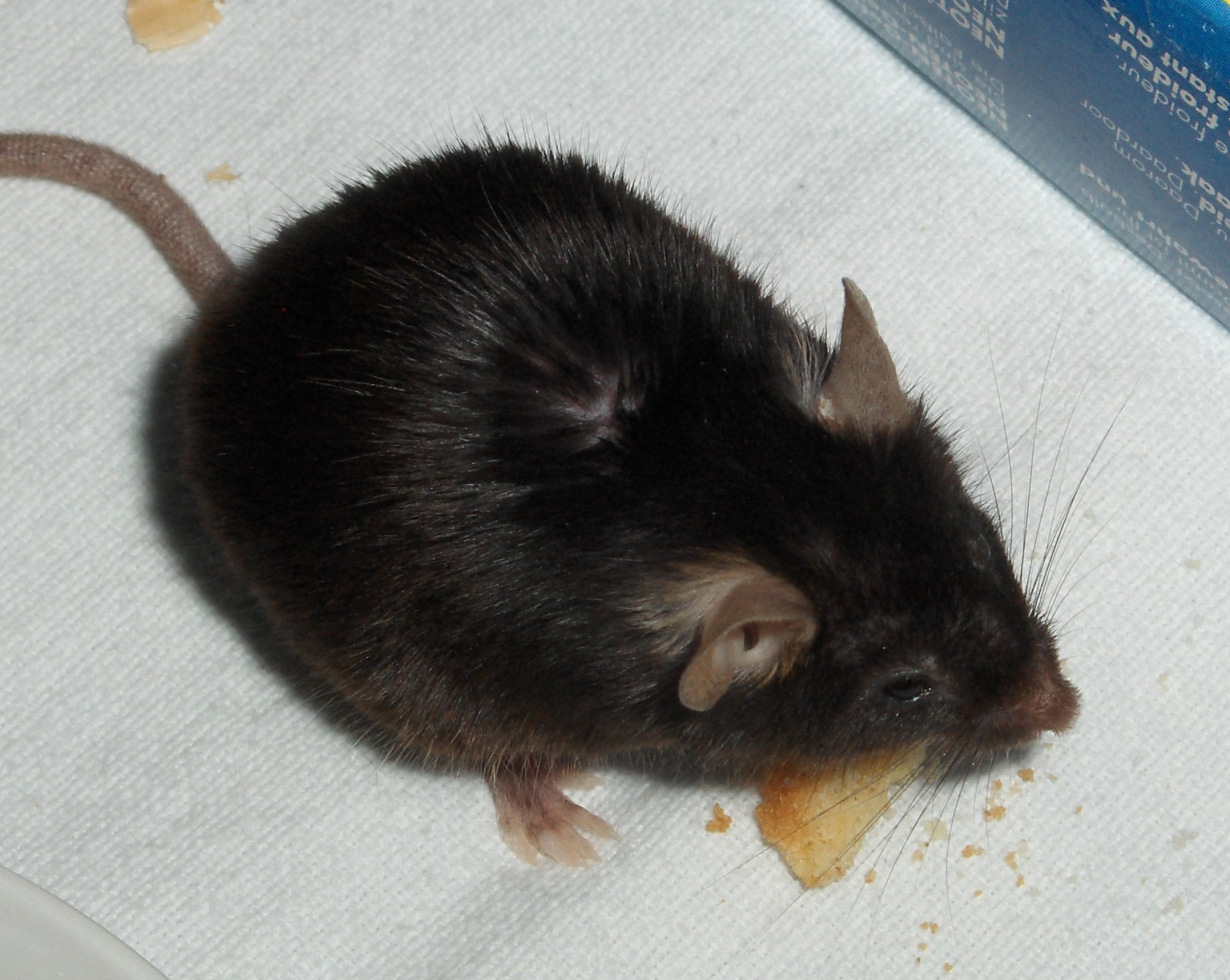
- A female C57BL/6 laboratory mouse, which is domesticated from Mus musculus domesticus.

Scientific classification
- Kingdom: Animalia
- Phylum: Chordata
- Class: Mammalia
- Order: Rodentia
- Family: Muridae
- Genus: Mus
- Species: M. musculus
- Subspecies: M. m. domesticus

Trinomial name
- Mus musculus domesticus Schwarz and Schwarz, 1943

= Mus musculus domesticus =

Subspecies of rodent

Mus musculus domesticus, the Western European house mouse, is a subspecies of the house mouse (Mus musculus). Some laboratory mouse strains, such as C57BL/6, are domesticated from M. m. domesticus.

== Distribution ==
In Europe, M. m. domesticus lives in Western and Southern Europe, while another subspecies, the Eastern European house mouse (M. m. musculus) lives in Eastern and Northern Europe. The area from Scandinavia to the Black Sea is a secondary hybrid zone for M. m. domesticus and M. m. musculus. Habitats of M. m. domesticus also exist in the Middle East, Southern Asia, North Africa, North America, and some areas of Latin America and Oceania.

== Relations with humans ==
M. m. domesticus is harmful to humans because it can damage vegetation and field crops, impacting food sources. It is also one of many invasive species.
