= Tripod stance =

Upright position with tail support in quadruped animals

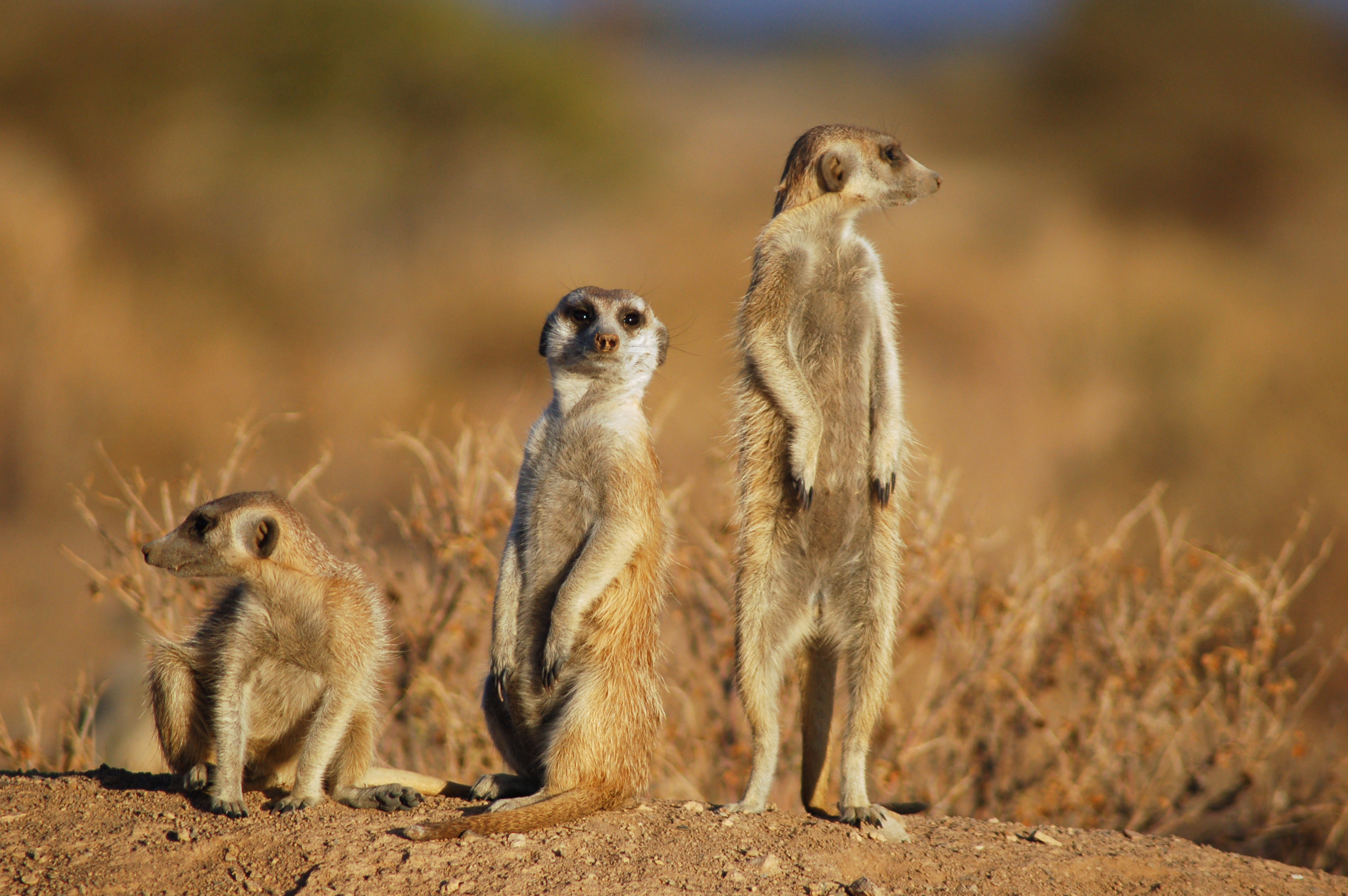
Meerkats adopt a range of postures while watching for predators. One individual (left) has 4 limbs in contact with the ground, another (middle) has only 2 limbs and the tail in contact, and another (right) is standing erect on its 2 hind legs and supported by the tail.

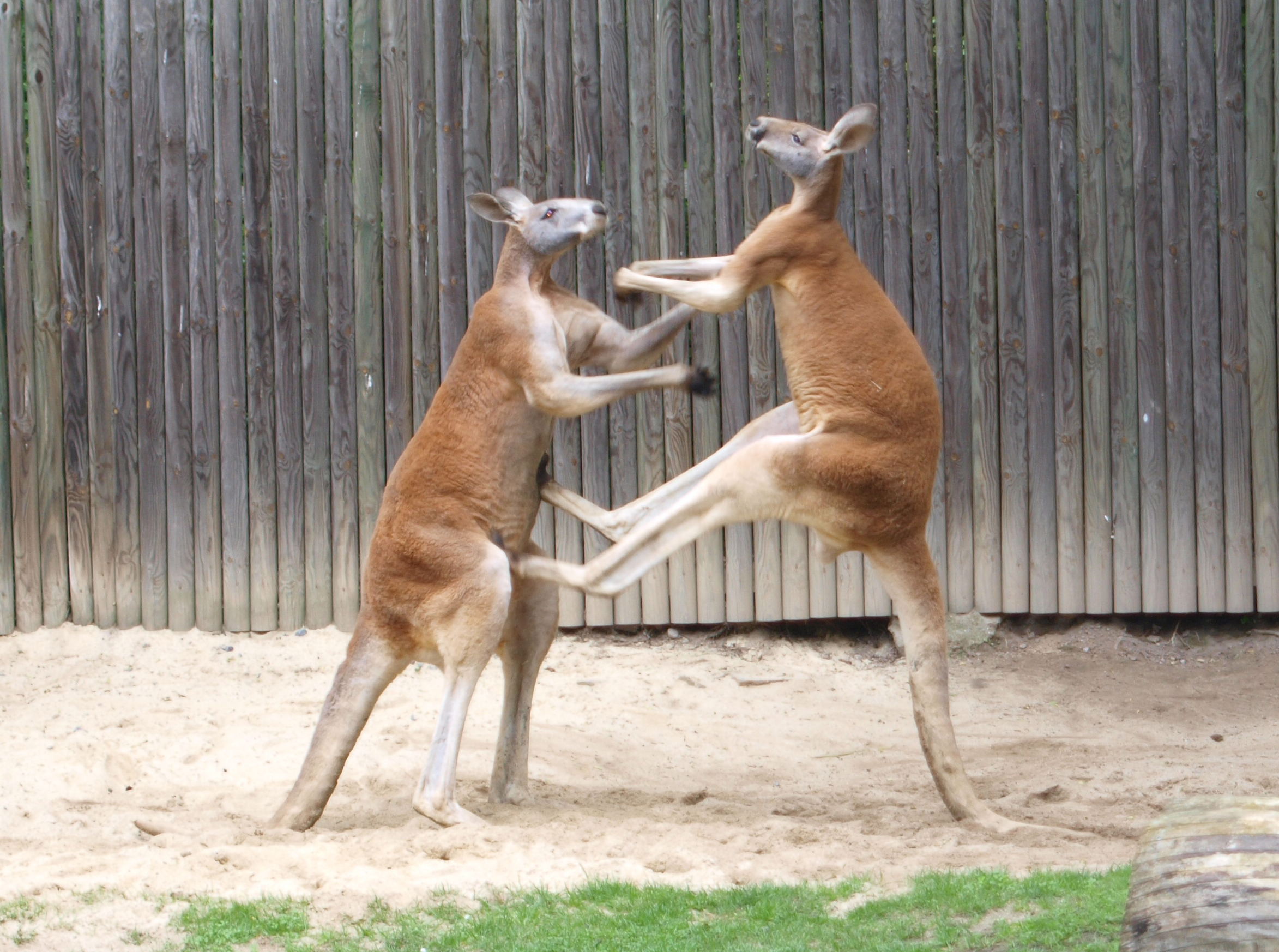
Kangaroos can stand erect on their hind legs, supported by their tail as the third leg of a tripod (they can even balance on their tail alone).

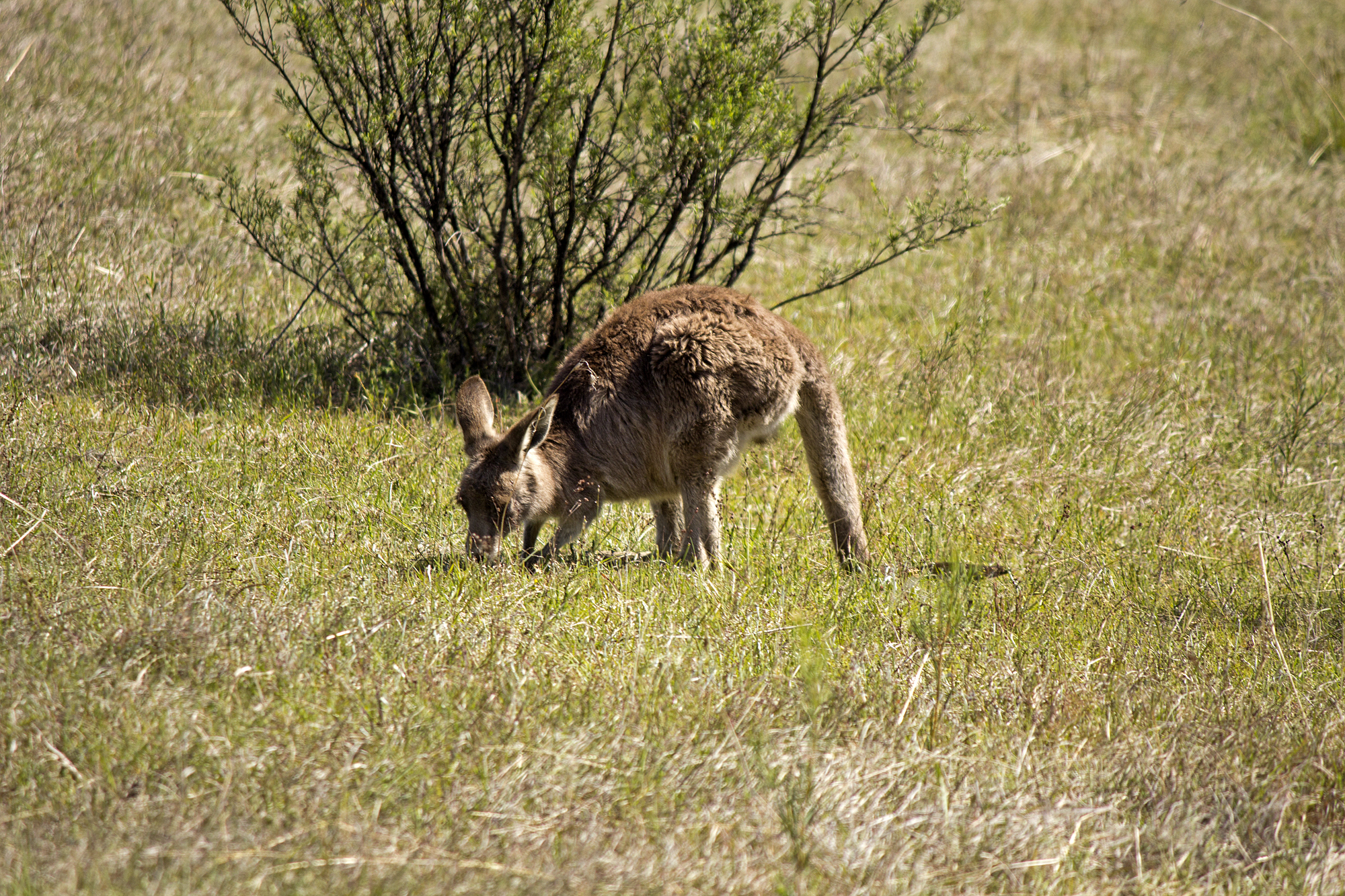
Kangaroos use "pentapedal locomotion" while grazing. In this gait, the tail and the forelimbs form a tripod while the hind legs are being moved.

A tripod stance is a behaviour in which quadruped animals rear up on their hind legs and use their tail to support this position. Several animals use this behaviour to improve observation or surveillance, and during feeding, grooming, thermoregulation, or fighting.

== In mammals ==
The common dwarf mongoose (Helogale parvula) adopts a tripod stance when being vigilant for predators. In a similar mammal, the thirteen-lined ground squirrel (Ictidomys tridecemlineatus), vigilance behaviour includes four postures: (1) quadrupedal alert (all four feet on the ground with head above the horizontal); (2) semiupright alert (on hind feet with a distinctive slouch); (3) upright alert (on hind feet with back straight and mostly perpendicular to the ground); (4) extended upright alert (similar to upright alert except that the squirrel extends its hind legs, (see image of meerkats). In meerkats (Suricata suricatta), the tripod stance may be adopted relatively briefly during foraging, in which case it is termed guarding behaviour, or for substantially longer periods when the animal is not foraging, in which case it is termed sentinel behaviour.

Macropods can stand erect on their hind legs, supported by their tail as the third leg of the tripod. Macropods also engage in "pentapedal locomotion," an energy-inefficient gait used at slow speed, in which "the tail is used, with the forelimbs, as the third leg of a tripod to support the animal while the large hind limbs are moved forward." When they were still alive, thylacines could also perform a bipedal hop in their high legs like a kangaroo as seen in captivity.

Giant armadillos (Priodontes maximus) have a well-developed sense of smell but poor eyesight. When approached by a potential threat, they rise up onto their hind legs, supported by the tail and begin to sniff from side to side. This tripod stance is similar to the defensive position adopted by anteaters and enables them to strike out with their sharply-hooked claws if suddenly attacked.

It has been reported that the desert woodrat (Neotoma lepida) gives birth "...in a bipedal position supported by the tail."

== In reptiles and amphibians ==
Monitor lizards such as the Komodo dragon (Varanus komodoensis) quite commonly stand on a tripod formed by their hind legs and tail.

Spectacled salamanders (Salamandrina terdigitata) sometimes stand on their hind legs supported by their tail. This reveals their brightly coloured belly, but the behaviour (referred to as "stand up behaviour") is performed in the absence of other salamanders or predators, and its function is unknown.

Some dinosaurs may also have occasionally adopted a tripod stance.

== Similar behaviour in non-quadrupeds ==
Several non-quadrupeds adopt a tripod-like stance and may have specialised structures to achieve this.

The tripodfish (Bathypterois grallator) has long, bony rays that protrude below its tail fin and both pectoral fins. Although the body of the fish is 36 cm (14 in), its fins can be more than 1 m (3 ft 3 in). The tripod fish spends much of its time standing on its three fins on the bottom of the ocean, hunting its food.

All woodpeckers have "zygodactyl" feet - two toes in front, two behind - as an aid in clinging to tree bark. In addition, stiff modified tail feathers on most species help to prop the bird in a tripod stance when clinging vertically. Other climbing birds such as Brown Creepers, Nuthatches, Swallows & Swifts and Lovebirds will use their tail as a support tripod against the surface being climbed, even possessing specially adapted tail feathers.

Many leaf-mining moths adopt a tripod stance when resting on a surface.

Tripod-like stance in non-quadrupeds

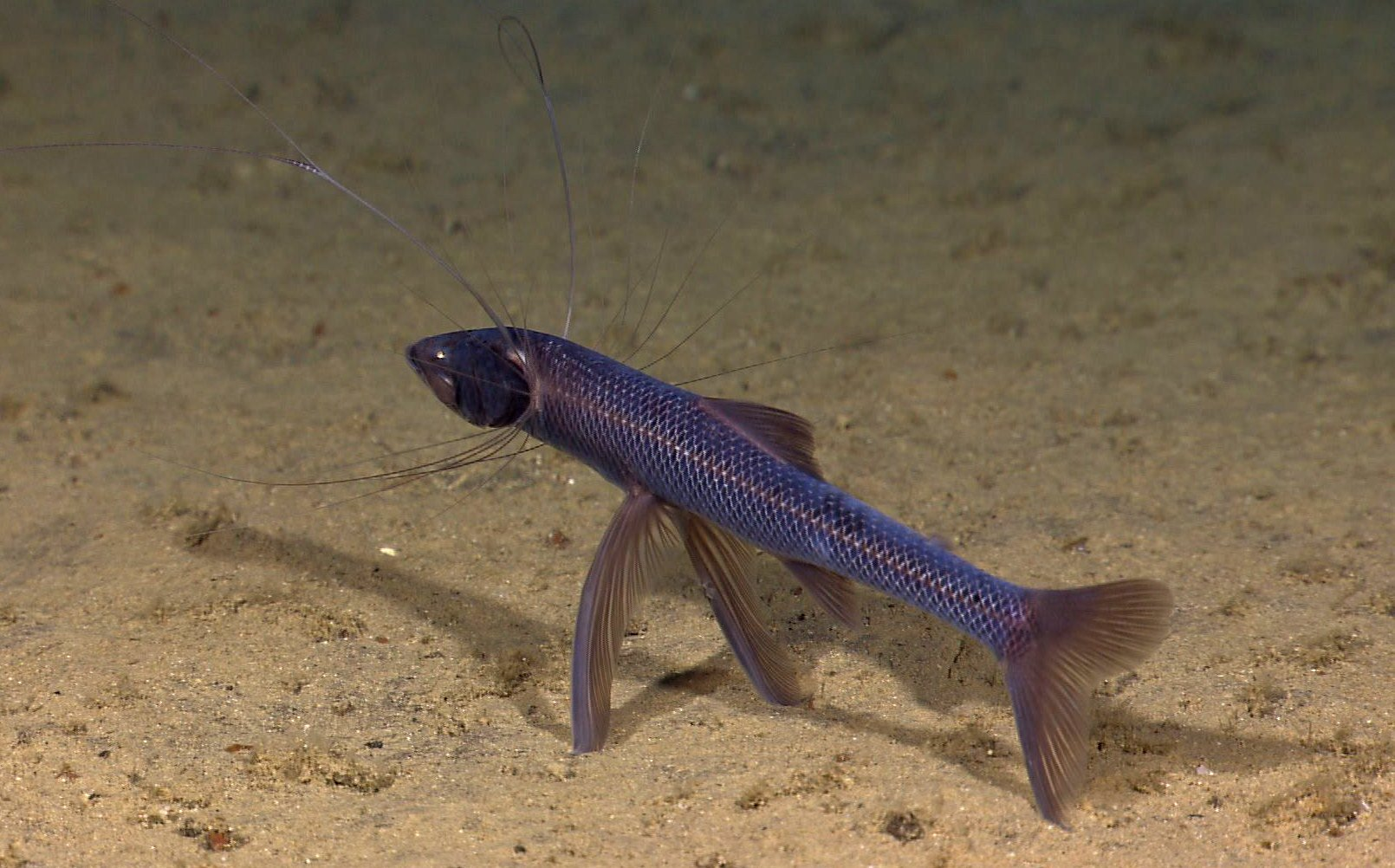
Tripod fish in its usual stance

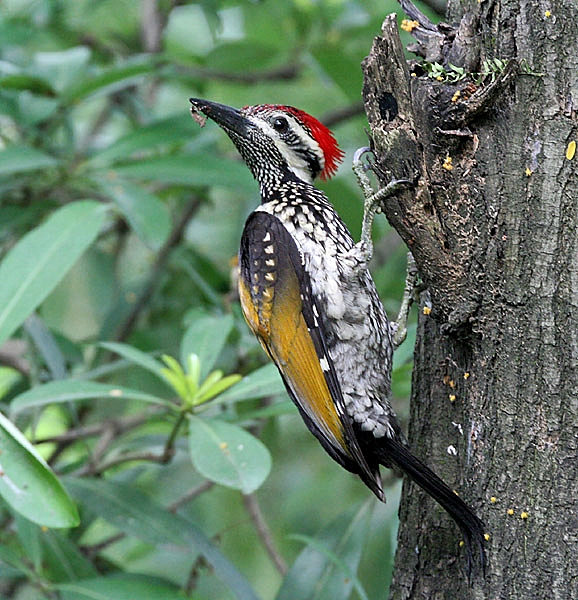
The stiffened tails of woodpeckers are used as a prop.

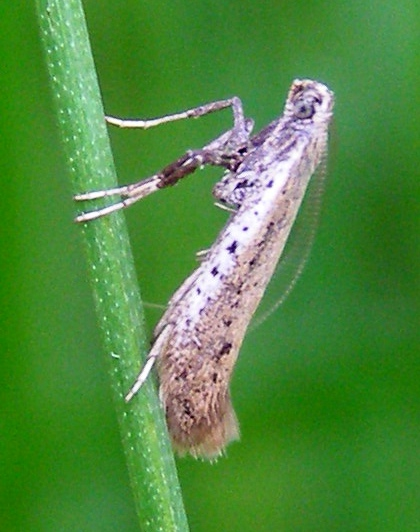
A moth resting on its abdomen and legs

== See also ==
- Ethogram
