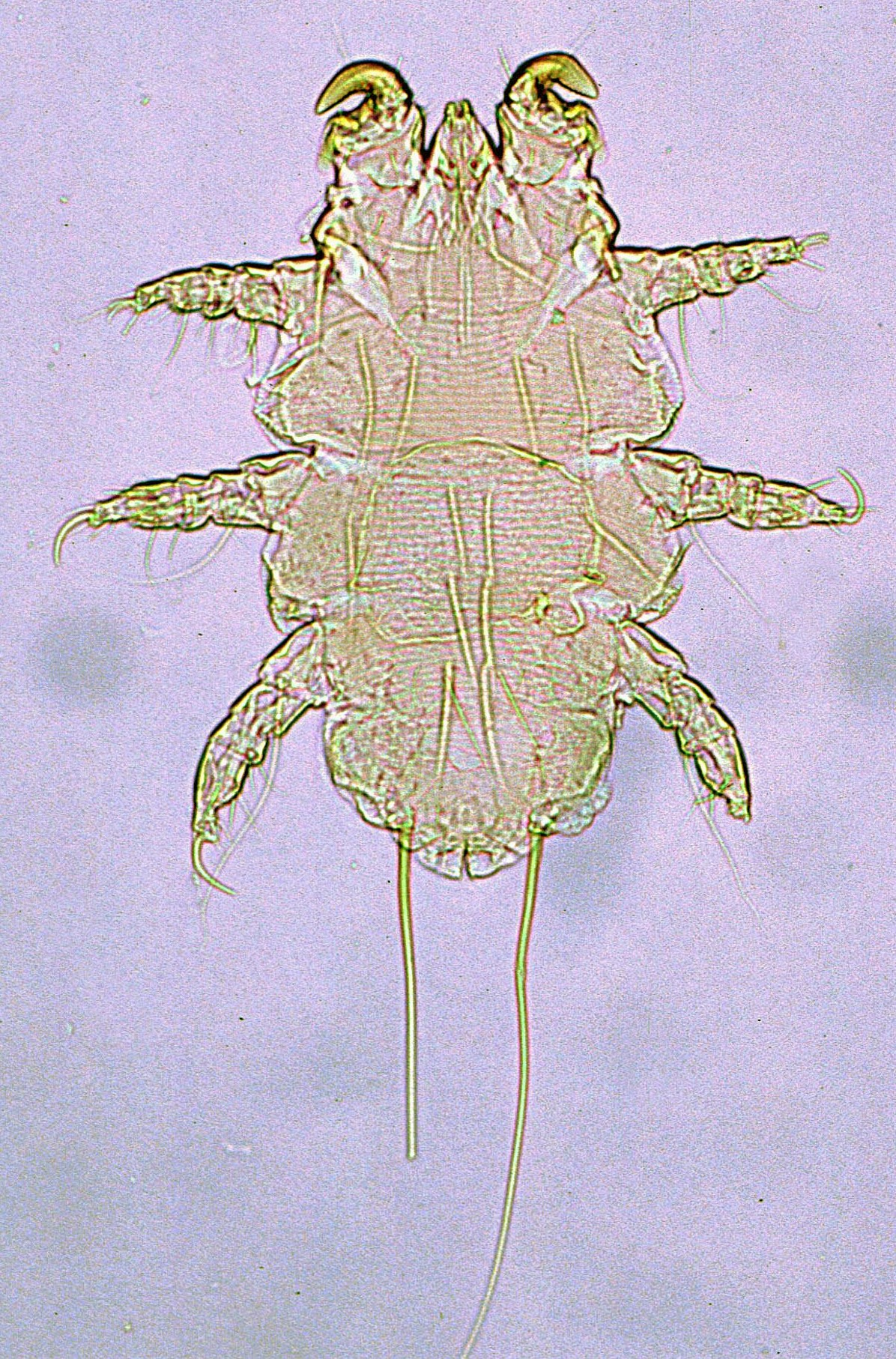

Scientific classification
- Kingdom: Animalia
- Phylum: Arthropoda
- Subphylum: Chelicerata
- Class: Arachnida
- Order: Trombidiformes
- Suborder: Prostigmata
- Infraorder: Eleutherengona
- Superfamily: Myobioidea; Mégnin, 1877
- Family: Myobiidae; Mégnin, 1877

= Myobiidae =

Family of mites

Myobiidae is a family of mites, containing the following genera:

- Acanthophthirius Perkins, 1925
- Acrobatobia Fain & Lukoschus, 1976
- Amorphacarus Ewing, 1938
- Anuncomyobia Fain, 1972
- Australomyobia Fain, 1973
- Binunculoides Fain, 1972
- Binuncus Radford, 1954
- Blarinobia Jameson, 1955
- Chimarrogalobia K. Uchikawa, 1986
- Crocidurobia Jameson, 1970
- Cryptomyobia Radford, 1954
- Eadiea Jameson, 1949
- Eudusbabekia E. W. Jameson, 1971
- Eutalpacarus Jameson, 1949
- Ewingana Radford, 1952
- Foliomyobia Radford, 1948
- Furipterobia K. Uchikawa, 1988
- Gundimyobia Fain & Lukoschus, 1976
- Gymnomyobia Fain & Lukoschus, 1976
- Hipposiderobia Dusbábek, 1968
- Idiurobia Fain, 1973
- Ioannela Dusbábek & Lukoschus, 1973
- Limnogalobia Fain & Lukoschus, 1976
- Madamyobia Fain & Lukoschus, 1975
- Metabinuncus Fain, 1972
- Microgalobia Fain, 1972
- Myobia von Heyden, 1826
- Mystacobia Fain, 1972
- Myzopodobia K. Uchikawa, 1988k
- Natalimyobia K. Uchikawa, 1988
- Nectogalobia A. Fain & Lukoschus, 1976
- Neomyobia Radford, 1948
- Nycterimyobia Fain, 1972
- Oryzorictobia Fain & Lukoschus, 1976
- Phyllostomyobia Fain, 1973
- Placomyobia Jameson, 1970
- Proradfordia Lukoschus, Dusbábek & Jameson, 1973
- †Protohylomysobia Sidorchuk & Bochkov in Sidorchuk et al., 2018
- Protomyobia Ewing, 1938
- Pteracarus Jameson & Chow, 1952
- Pteropimyobia Fain, 1973
- Radfordia Ewing, 1938
- Schizomyobia Fain, 1972
- Thyromyobia Fain, 1976
- Ugandobia Dusbábek, 1968
- Xenomyobia Fain & Lukoschus, 1977
