= Syrian hamster breeding =

Selective breeding of Syrian hamsters

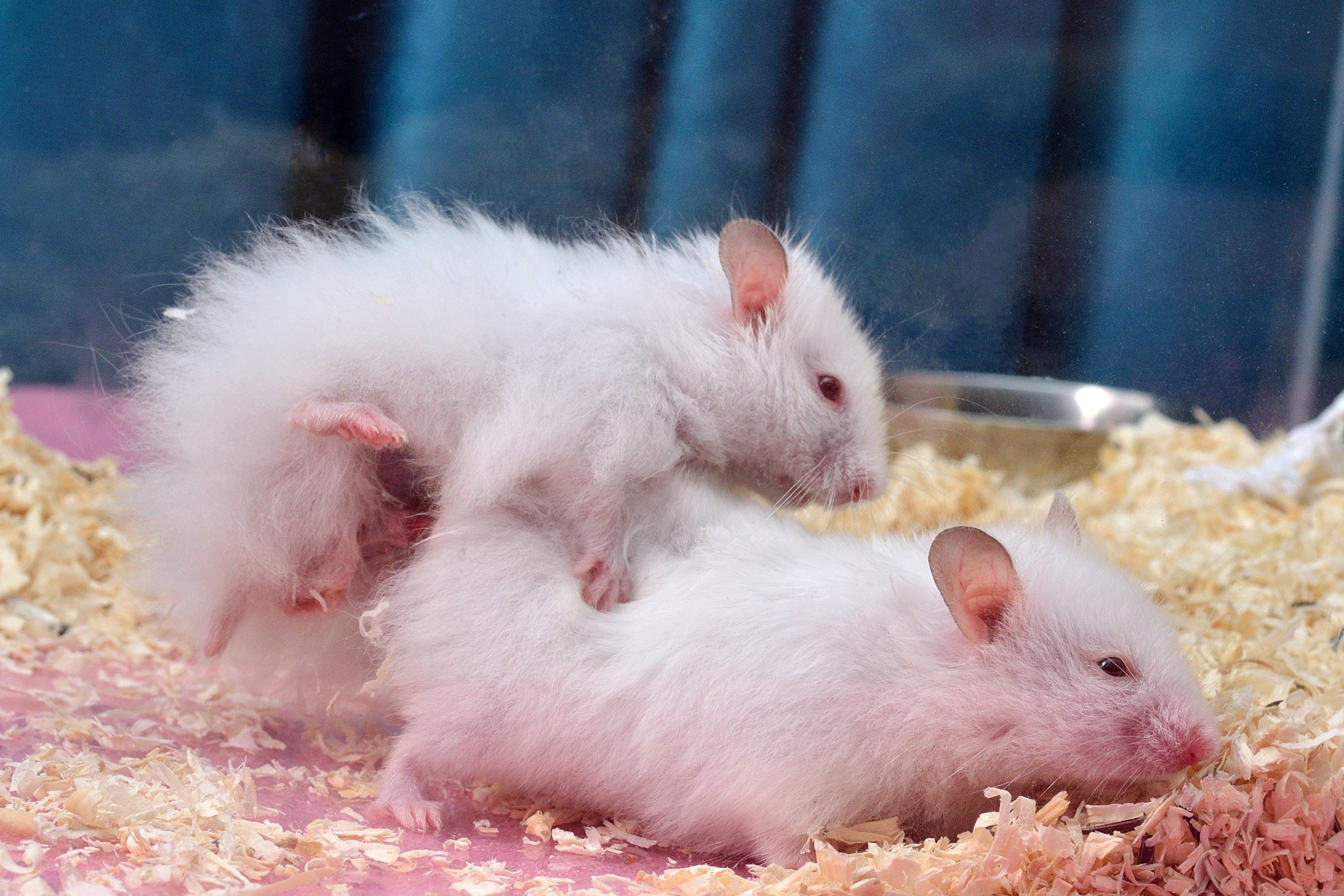
Syrian hamster - mating

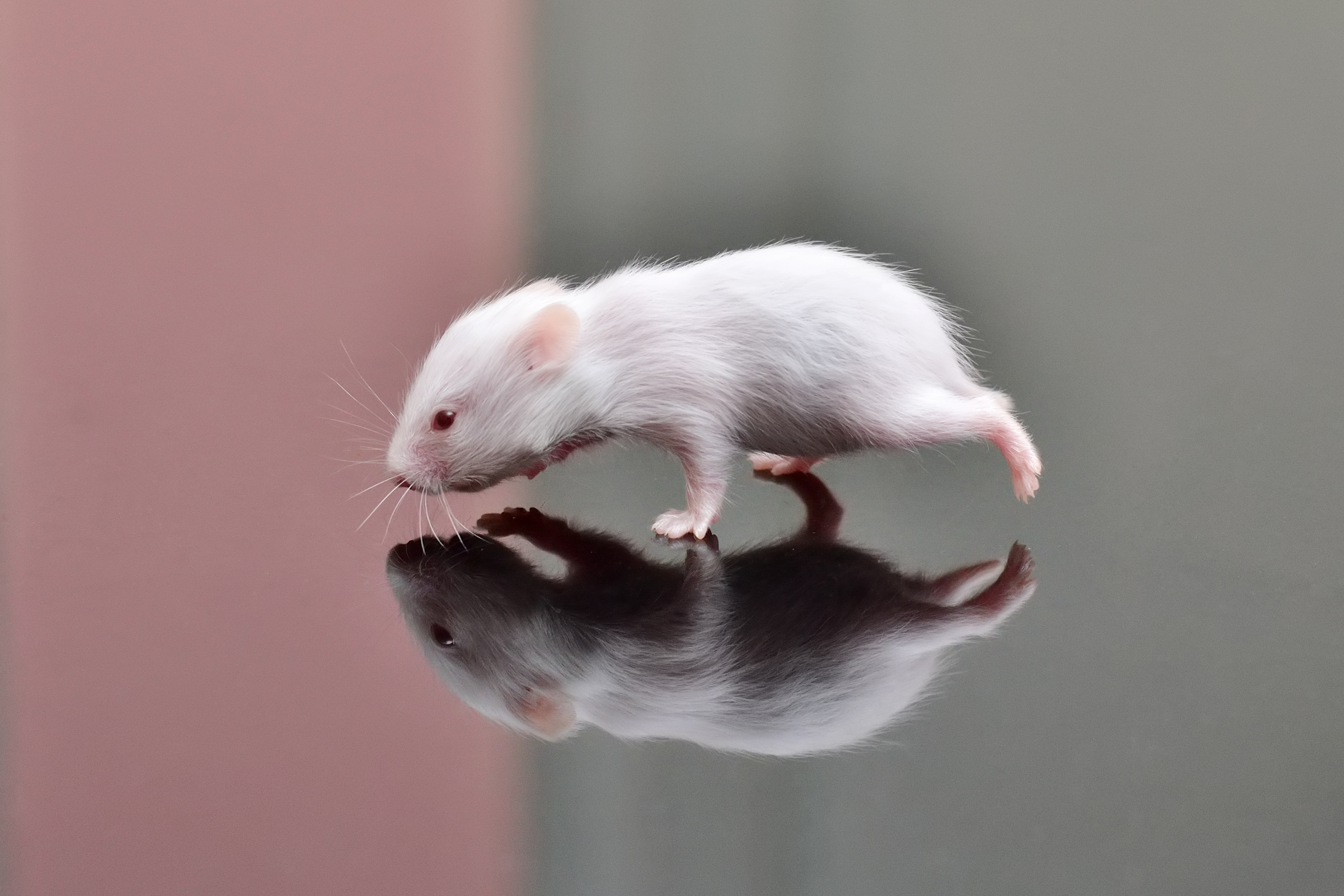
A two weeks old baby hamster

Syrian hamster breeding is selective breeding on Syrian hamsters. The practice of breeding requires an understanding of care for the Syrian hamster, knowledge about Syrian hamster variations, a plan for selective breeding, scheduling of the female body cycle, and the ability to manage a colony of hamsters.

== Choosing hamsters to breed ==
Syrian hamsters reproductive values
Trait	Syrian hamster value
estrous cycle	4 days
breeding age and weight female	56 days or 90-110g
breeding age and weight male	63 days or 100-120g
duration of estrous	4-23 hours, 20 average
postpartum return to estrus	5-10 minutes
gestation	16 days
weaning age and weight	21 days, 35-40g
age beginning dry food	7-9 days
litter size	4-12, with 7-8 average
mating scheme	pairs or 1 male to 2-4 females

Mother hamsters younger than 13 weeks old are likely to have a high number of babies, which can lead to complications in pregnancy and less healthy births. Mother hamsters that are older than 8 months for their first litter may have other kinds of pregnancy problems. Mating a mother who is between 4-6 months old is a standard recommendation. The age of the male hamster is less important, except that young males may have no interest in the female and older male hamsters may not be fertile. Any adult male hamster will typically always be ready to mate with any female hamster.

"Satin coat" and "white-bellied" are technical terms among hamster breeders that refer to hamsters with certain genes giving them characteristics that pet owners desire. When hamster babies with either of these traits are desired, then breeders make sure that only one and not both hamster parents have one of these characteristics. If both hamster parents have the Satin gene, then their offspring are likely to have fur problems including baldness, and have poor health. If both hamster parents are white-bellied, then the offspring are likely to be born without eyes.

There is a certain genetic defect that can give a hamster a kinked tail instead of the usual straight tail. The tail will have a bend that can be felt by touching, but is not usually visible. Hamsters with kinked tails are not bred at all.

In hamster shows, hamsters with physical defects are disqualified. This discourages such hamsters from being used in breeding.

For preserving the health of Syrian hamsters and advancing ethical breeding methods, a thorough understanding of these genetic and breeding dynamics is essential.

== Female body cycle ==
If a female hamster encounters a male when her estrous cycle is not at the point for mating, then the two hamsters will be aggressive to each other and could be injured or killed from fighting. When a female hamster is in season to breed, her estrous cycle spans four days. Every fourth day between sunset and sunrise she will be in heat and receptive to mating. She will be more receptive later in the night.

In the wild, hamster mating season is spring and summer, so hamster mothers only go into heat in those seasons. In typical domestic settings, female hamsters will breed year-round. The triggering factors that make year-round breeding are 12 hours of daily light and absence of cold in the winter.

Progression of the estrous cycle includes different vaginal discharges. On the morning of the day 1 the female is sexually dormant. In the evening of the first day, she will become sexually receptive. On the morning of day 2, the sexually receptive period ends. By the evening of day 2 the female is sexually dormant. At this time the female will have a large discharge of thick white fluid that gives the hamster a particular strong smell. On the morning of day 3 the hamster's discharge will be waxy, and by evening the discharge ends. By day 4, the hamster has been sexually dormant since day 2. She may have clear mucous discharge. Day 5 is a repeat of day 1, as the cycle repeats. A female hamster who has had an unsuccessful mating on day 1 can be identified by her regular discharge on days 6 and 10 of this schedule.

== Introducing the pair ==
When the time is right, the breeder introduces male and female hamsters with supervision because of fear of aggression and fighting. They are separated after mating. Until this time, the hamsters will separately housed, as Syrian hamsters are strictly solitary. The male hamster must not be placed in the female's home. Either the female may be brought to the male's home, or a small box of neutral space may be outfitted with hamster bedding and presented as the mating area in which the breeder places both hamsters. A male typically will be ready to mate and not defend himself initially. If the female is not receptive, then she will attack him, in which case the hamsters must be separated to perhaps try again another time. If the hamsters fight for any other reason, they must be separated.

If the female is receptive, then she will run in front of the male a few steps, then freeze her body. The female then exhibits lordosis behavior. In response, the male will typically groom the female hamster's rear, then mount the female. Mating lasts several seconds. After mating, the male may groom himself or the female. Then he will mount the female again. The mating pair should be left to repeat this for 20-30 minutes or until one of the hamsters loses interest.

When supervising the mating, the breeder seeks to separate the hamsters if either becomes aggressive. During mating the male is likely to lightly bite the back of the female's neck, but if he is overaggressive, then they may fight. Sometimes the male may get distracted and groom the female's ears or become confused and try to mount the female from the front or side. If necessary, the breeder may poke the male to get his attention, which will usually prompt the male to try again from the beginning. If the male loses interest in the female, even without aggression, breeders will separate the hamsters.

== Record keeping ==
There are established general practices for record keeping in animal breeding. These practices can apply to any breeding program, and are commonly applied to Syrian hamster breeding programs.

Larger breeding operations almost certainly must be managed with a digital database. Smaller breeding operations still use paper records. Minimum record keeping typically includes the following information:

- source of animal
- identification of foundation bloodstock or strain
- name of person managing animal
- relevant dates
  - date of birth
  - dates of major interactions, like health care interventions
  - date of acquisition, if acquired from external source
- in the case of research animals, reference to institutional clearance for research
- genealogy

Record keeping might include details about environmental and care conditions. Records might be kept for environmental temperature, humidity, light cycles, when pens are cleaned, what sort of food is provided, and who has access to the animals. Health records might include medical observations, diagnosis of any medical conditions, and notes about any health care animals have received.

== Notes ==
- Logsdail, Chris; Logsdail, Peter; Hovers, Kate (2002). Hamsterlopaedia : a complete guide to hamster care. Lydney: Ringpress. ISBN 1860542468.
- Field, Karl J.; Sibold, Amber L. (1999). The laboratory hamster & gerbil. Boca Raton [u.a.]: CRC Press. ISBN 0849325668.
- Mulder, Guy B. (2012). "Management, Husbandry, and Colony Health". In Suckow, Mark A.; Stevens, Karla A.; Wilson, Ronald P. (eds.). The laboratory rabbit, guinea pig, hamster, and other rodents (1st. ed.). Amsterdam: Elsevier Academic Press. pp. 765–775. ISBN 978-0123809209.
