= Animal show =

Exhibition or competition of animals

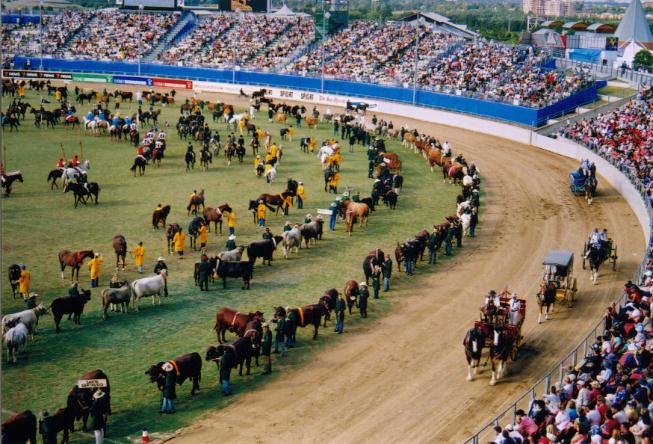
Grand Parade, Sydney Royal Easter Show.

An animal show is a form of exhibition featuring the display or performance of one or more breeds of animal.

== Purpose ==
An animal show can be for entertainment, educational, and/or commercial purpose. A judged event may rank specimens for the benefit of those involved in animal breeding or husbandry, or provide entertainment to animal fancy hobbyists.

== Types of shows ==
The US Animal Welfare Act identifies a number of types of animal exhibitions:

=== Amusement parks ===
Modern amusement parks often feature performing marine mammals and even contain drive-thru animal safari tours. The animal shows are typically operated by a contracted performer, while the animal parks are owned by the theme park itself.

=== Animal fighting ventures ===
The US Animal Welfare Act prohibits the staging of dog fighting or baiting (including bear or raccoon-baiting). Cockfighting is outlawed in every state in the United States but is not banned nationally in the US.

=== Animal performances ===
Animals perform tricks and stunts in the circus, marine mammal shows, amusement parks, carnivals, independent animal acts, television shows, movies, and educational exhibits. These can be licensed acts with booking agents.

=== Carnivals ===
Animals can be displayed or be given as prizes by concessionaires at carnivals.

=== Farm animal exhibitions ===
Farm animals are exhibited at agricultural shows, fairs, and other exhibitions. In the US, 4-H is actively involved in youth participation in the exhibition of livestock at county and state fairs and dedicated livestock shows.

=== Horse shows ===
Horse shows are competitions in which riders cause their horses to perform particular gaits and activities for recognition and prizes.

=== Marine mammal shows ===
Marine mammal shows include the display or performance of marine mammals such as polar bears, sea otters, whales, porpoises, dolphins, manatees, dugongs, seals, sea lions, walruses, and other mammals with fins or flippers.

In 2013, Miller and his colleagues showed that dolphin shows and public interaction with dolphins increases « knowledge, attitudes and behavioral intentions » towards dolphins and their environment, on a limited time scale. They have also revealed that the more the shows were seen, the more people were taking conservation actions.

Unfortunately, many studies have demonstrated that several marine mammals are not made for captivity and keeping them in these tanks is a form of cruelty. Also, the main messages send by these shows are told to be controversial.

To face these difficulties, Edge Innovation created a robotic dolphin. The goal is to keep educating and entertaining the public without having to keep marine mammals in captivity.

=== Pet shows ===
Dog shows, cat shows, hamster shows, and rabbit shows are exhibitions for breeders and breed enthusiasts.

The Westminster Kennel Club Dog Show has been held annually since 1877. Over 300,000 dogs were rated by 134 judges in 134 shows through 2011.

=== Promotional exhibits ===
Animals are sometimes used to attract business to a commercial enterprise, such as a bear at a gasoline service station, a monkey at a trade show, or an elephant at a shopping center. These animals are typically displayed but might also perform in a show.

=== Rodeos ===
Farm animals and horses perform competitively at rodeos.

=== Zoological parks ===
Modern zoos often include animal shows for educational purposes. Petting zoos and roadside zoos are commercial enterprises that typically only display animals.
