= Syrian hamster variations =

Fur and skin colour variations of the show pet

Colours of the Syrian hamster can be described in three ways: as "self", "agouti", or "combinations". Self colours are a consistent coat colour with the same colour topcoat and undercoat. Agouti hamsters have a ticked coat, where each individual fur is banded in different colours. Agouti hamsters also have "agouti markings" which consist of dark cheek markings, a dark marking on the head, and a light underbelly. Combinations are produced when two (or more) self or agouti colours are present.

== Natural hamster mutations ==
Natural hamster mutations are those that crop up naturally; unlike combination mutations, these are mutations unto themselves and not expressed by mixing two genes.

== Golden ==
Golden is the original and most common colouration of Syrian hamsters found in the wild. Originally classified as "Dark Golden" and "Light Golden", this description and standard has now fallen out of favour as a "Light Golden" is simply a Golden that lacks defined black ticking. Despite being the original mutation, the number of Creams and Cinnamons tends to outweigh the number of Goldens, and finding a pure line of Goldens not carrying any other known mutation has become difficult.

A Golden hamster is one with a reddish-brown coat and black agouti markings. Golden hamsters will have black eyes, grey ears, and an ivory belly.

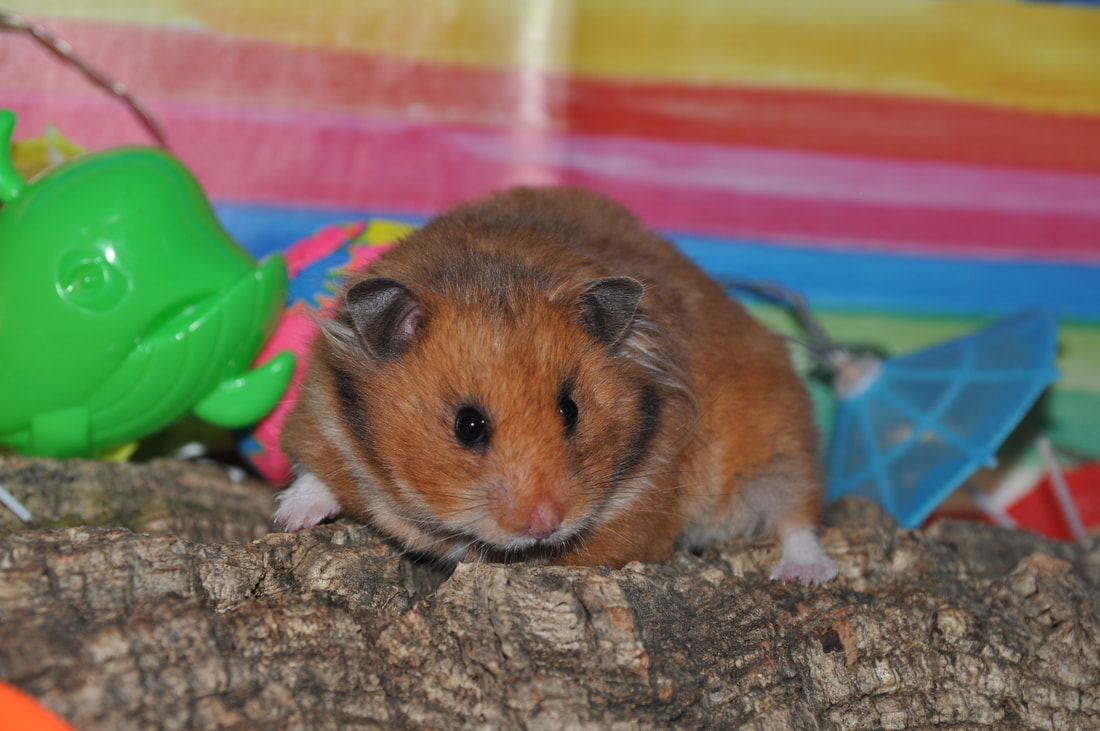
"Caoimhe" of Hathor Hamstery, a golden longhaired female

== Dilute ==
Dilute genetics in Syrian hamsters primarily revolve around the C locus (color locus), which controls temperature-sensitive partial albinism and pigment reduction, resulting in a lighter color.

Variation	Genotype
Extreme Dilute	cc
Heterozygous Extreme Dilute	cecd
Standard Dilute	dd

== Black ==
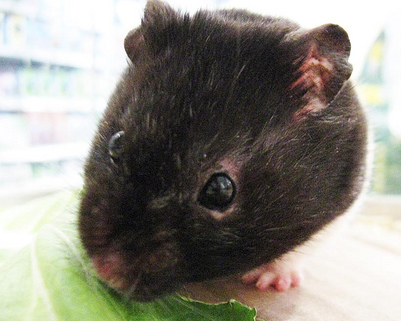
A male black hamster

The Black colour was imported to the UK in 1991. Before then, Sables were referred to as black, but are lighter than the actual Black hamsters. Black hamsters have a consistent jet black coat, with some white on the paws and belly. The Black gene is recessive, which is why the variation was not discovered until recently. The discovery of the Black hamster has allowed scientists and breeders to produce many new variations, including Dove, when bred with Cinnamon hamsters, and Chocolate, when combined with Rust. This colouration is often falsely known as "Black Bear" and, if with a Band or other White Pattern, "Panda Bear". Both of these terms are, however, incorrect.

Variation	Genotype
Black	aa

== Chocolate ==
Chocolate hamsters have a solid brown color. Both parents must carry and pass down at least one a and one b gene, making them heterozygous or homozygous for those traits for their offspring to express the chocolate phenotype.

Variation	Genotype
Chocolate	aabb

== Cream ==
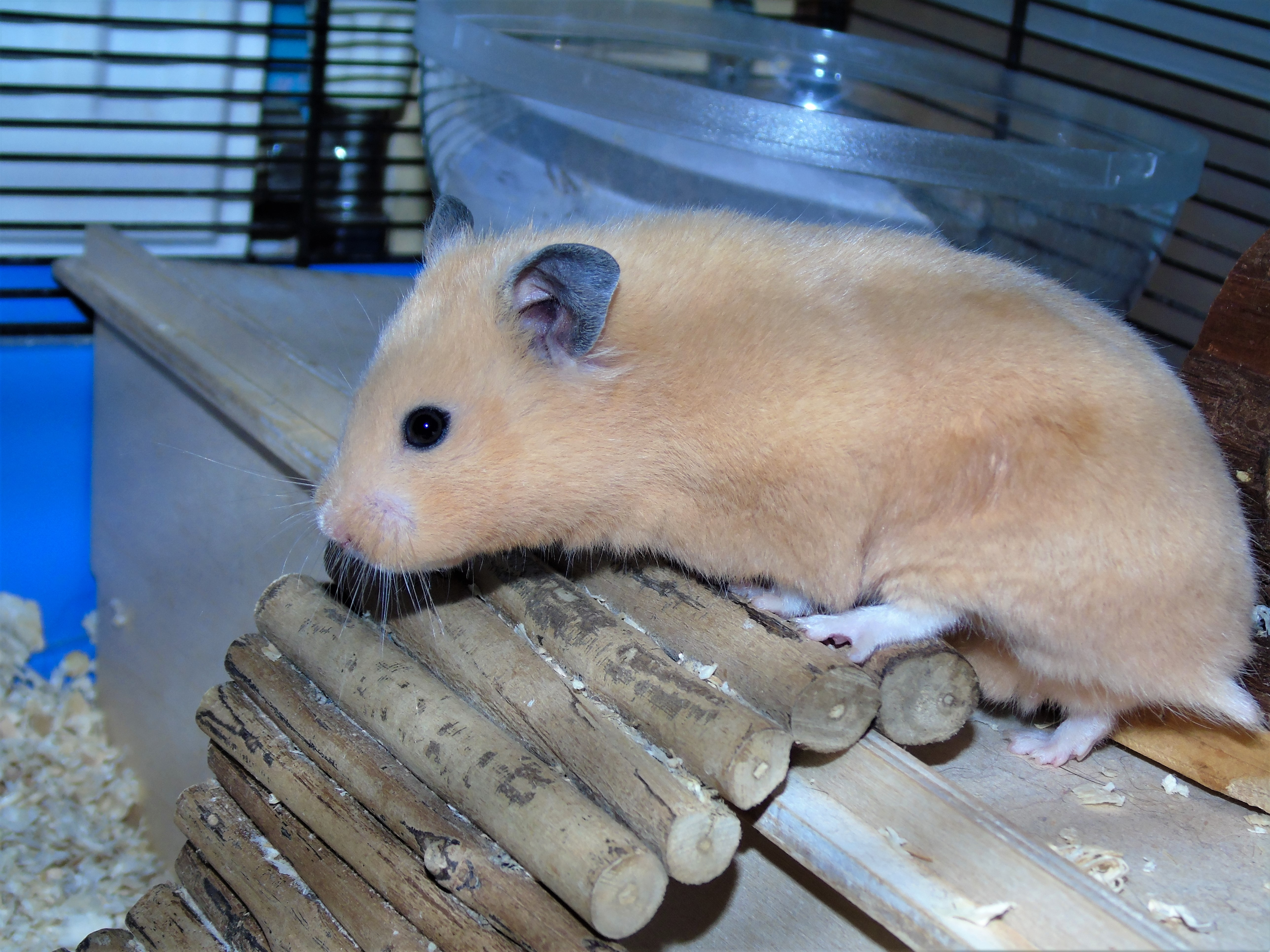
Pedigree female black eyed Cream

The Cream variety ranges from sandy to orange-cream. This variation (a naturally occurring mutation) was first discovered in the United Kingdom in 1951 and is a "self" colour. There are further sub-types of this variation, determined by the colour of the eyes, which can be black, red or ruby. Black-Eyed Creams typically have dark grey ears, although this is not necessarily the case, whereas Red-Eyed Creams have flesh-coloured ears. Red-Eyed Cream occurs when both the Cream gene "ee" and the Cinnamon gene "pp" are shown together on the hamster.

Variation	Genotype
Black-Eyed Cream	ee
Red-Eyed Cream	eepp

== Cinnamon ==
Cinnamon is a recessive gene and is a very common one. It first appeared in 1958. Many owners confuse this colour with Golden, Honey and Yellow. Cinnamon hamsters will have a red body, blue agouti markings, red eyes, and pink ears. On poorer quality Cinnamon coats, the agouti markings may just appear darker red than the body. Cinnamon hamsters will also have an ivory/white belly.

Variation	Genotype
Cinnamon	pp

== Champagne ==
Champagne golden hamsters have a soft, light-brown or warm beige-cream coat resulting from specific color-diluting genetics.

Variation	Genotype
Champagne	aabbpp

== White ==
There are three different types of White hamster: Dark, Flesh-Eared and Black-Eyed. All three are completely white. The Dark-Eared variety first appeared in 1952 and has red eyes which darken as the animal ages. Black-Eyed Whites have flesh-coloured ears. Flesh-Eared Whites, often described as albinos, were first mentioned in the National Hamster Council Journal in 1956. As the name suggests, Flesh-Eared Whites have flesh ears and pink eyes.

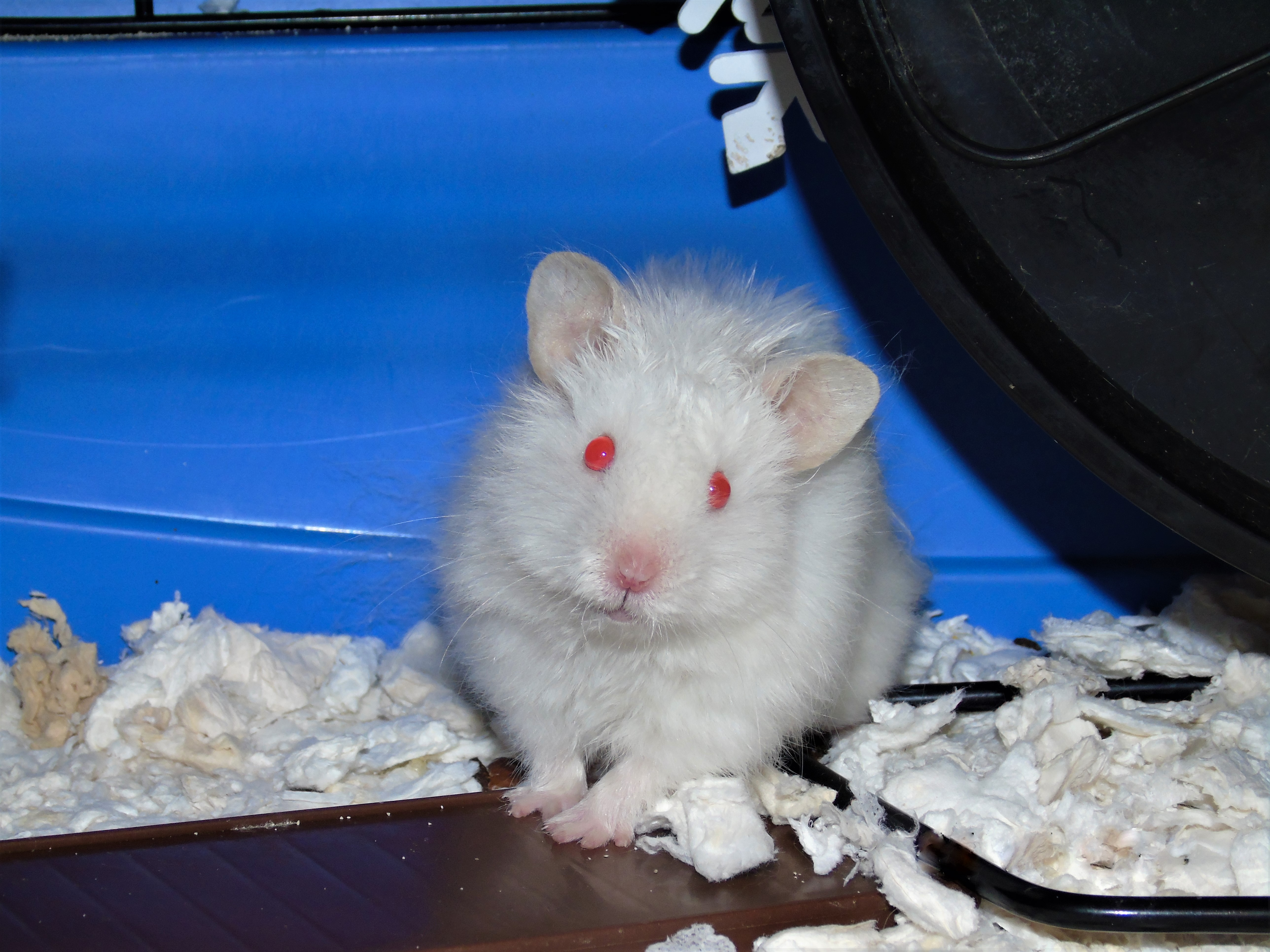
Male long haired flesh eared white

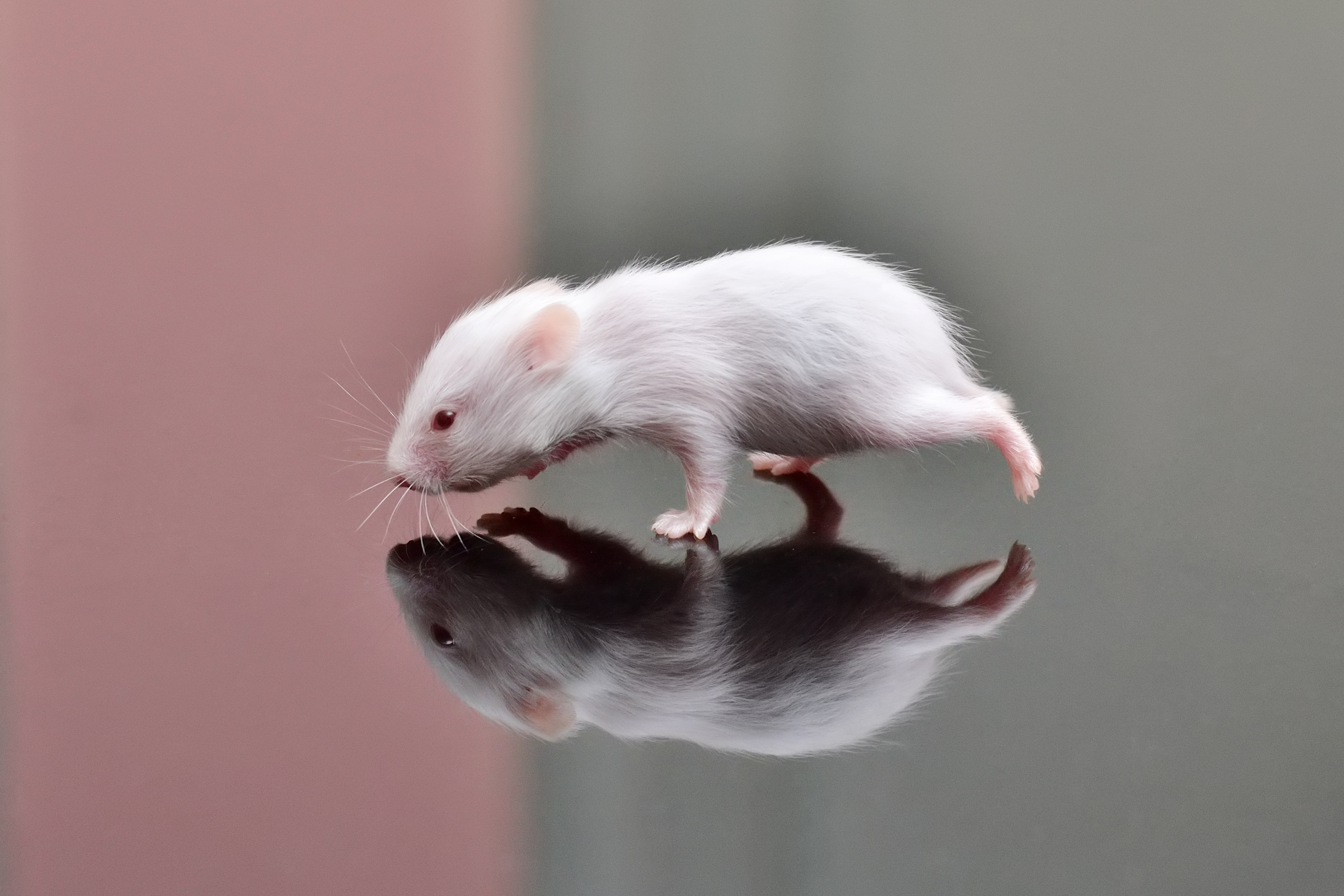
A two-week old baby hamster

Variation	Genotype
Black-Eyed White	eeDsds or eeWhwh
Dark-Eared White	cdcd
Flesh-Eared White	cdcdpp

== Rust ==
Rust, formerly called Guinea Gold, is a naturally occurring mutation that is currently very rare. They are easily mistaken for Goldens. The difference between a Rust and a Golden is mostly in the cheek flashes; in Rust they are brown rather than black, and the base colour for Rust is a brownish colour rather than a slate grey.

Variation	Genotype
Rust	bb

== Dark Grey ==
Dark Grey is a recessive mutation. Due to the Dark Grey's genes, there is often a mutation known as "kinked tail". The genes for kinked tail are heavily linked to the Dark Grey gene.

Variation	Genotype		
Dark Grey	dgdg	Kinked Tail	dgdgK

== Light Grey ==
This gene is currently extremely rare. Light Greys fell out of favour to the Silver Grey and Dark Grey genes due to the fact that Light Grey was difficult to breed and a lot of Light Greys had aggression issues and smaller size. If two Light Greys were mated, any pups which were "LgLg" would die in utero.

Variation	Genotype
Light Grey	Lglg

== Silver Grey ==
Silver Grey is a highly dominant gene. It was discovered in Sweden and brought to the UK in 1991. Because it is highly dominant, not many hamsteries want to work with it. Silver Grey should never be bred to Dark Grey as it can make it difficult to tell which is which; likewise it should also never be bred to Polywhite or any mutations with the Black (aa) gene.

Variation	Genotype
Silver Grey	SgSg

== Yellow ==
Yellow is a sex-linked mutation; this means that, depending on the sex, the gene code and the colours produced when mating will depend on which gender was the Yellow. The Yellow gene locus is on the X chromosome, one of the sex chromosomes. Female hamsters, like all female mammals, have two X chromosomes, while males have an X and a Y chromosome. Yellow is an incomplete dominant gene; a hamster needs to have at least one Yellow gene in order to be Yellow, but if another gene is expressed at the same time this causes both Yellow and the other colour to be expressed. This produces patches of Yellow and non Yellow fur, which is known as Tortoiseshell. Since only female hamsters have two X chromosomes, (and hence two Yellow gene loci), only females can be Tortoiseshell. Male hamsters are either Yellow or non Yellow.

Female Yellow hamsters must inherit Yellow from both parents and hence can only occur in litters where the male has the Yellow gene and the female is either Yellow or Tortoiseshell.

Variation	Genotype		
Female Yellow	ToTo	Male Yellow	To_

== Combination mutations ==
These are mutations that occur when two or more genes are expressed at the same time.

== Beige ==
Beige is a rare colour, because it is produced by breeding together a hamster with the Rust and Dark Grey gene, which are themselves rare. The Beige variety is often smaller than the rest of the litter and may have a kinked tail due to the Dark Grey gene.

Variation	Genotype
Beige	bbdgdg

== Sable ==
When it was discovered in 1975, this variation was originally named Black. Since the discovery of the melanistic Black variety, it has been renamed to Sable. The topcoat is black and the undercoat is ivory cream, with a black belly, black eyes and dark-grey ears. The fur around the eyes is also ivory cream. Sable comes from Umbrous bred to Cream.

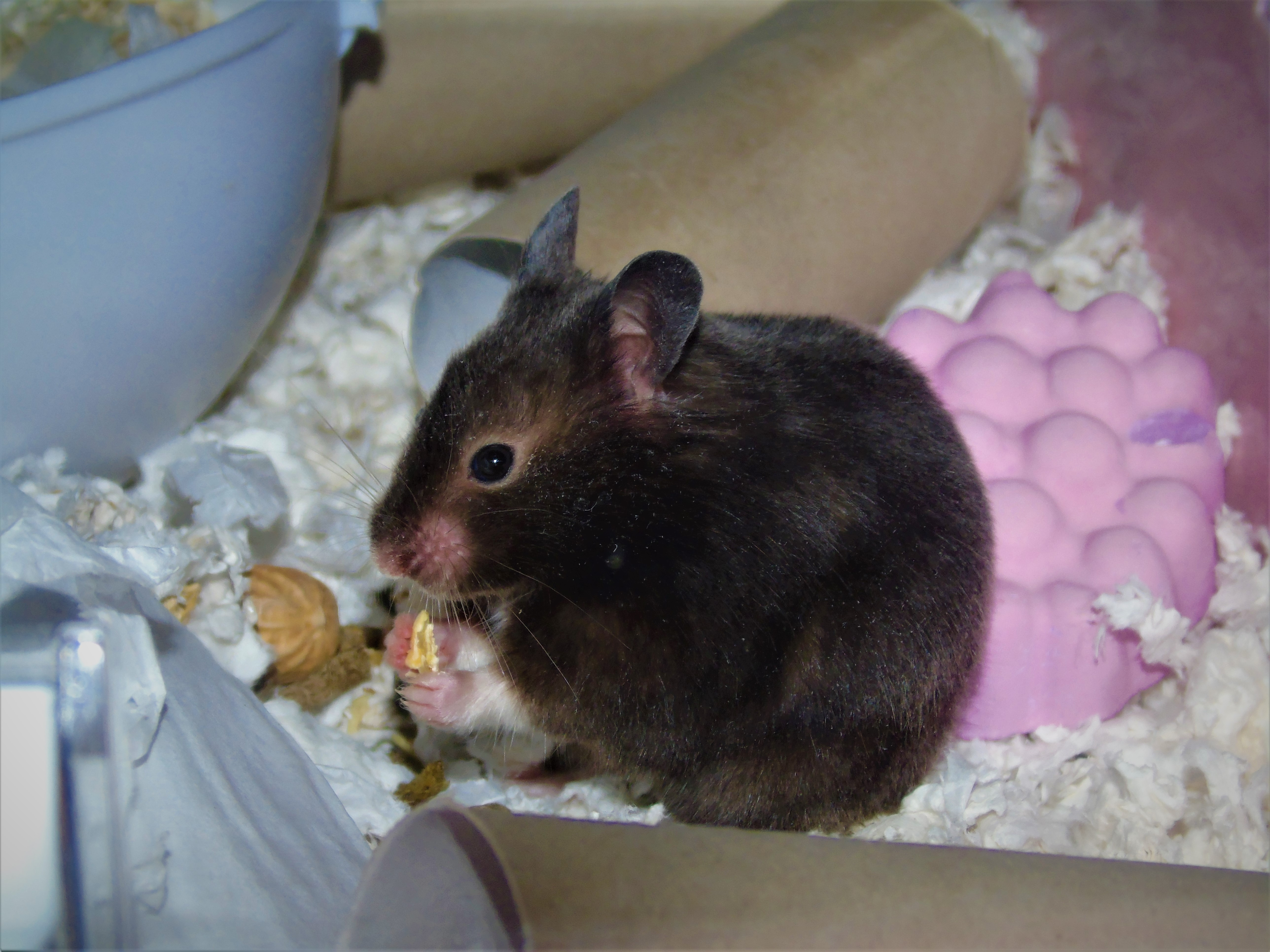
Female solid Sable Syrian

Variation	Genotype
Sable	UUee

== Ivory ==
Ivory is a combination gene that is not often seen. It can come in both Black-Eyed and Red-Eyed varieties. Ivory can be created by using any of the three Greys.

Variation	Genotype		
Red Eyed Ivory	eeppdgdg/eeppLglg/eeppSgSg	Black Eyed Ivory	eedgdg/eeLglg/eeSgSg

== Honey ==
Honey is a complex gene and as such is uncommon. Honey is made by combining the sex-linked Yellow gene and the recessive Cinnamon gene. Since females have two X chromosomes (see notes on Yellow), they must inherit both Cinnamon and Yellow genes from both parents. Males must inherit Cinnamon from both parents and the Yellow gene from their mother (on their single X chromosome).

If a male Yellow carrying Cinnamon is mated to a female Cinnamon, the result will not be Honey, but Golden or Cinnamon males and Cinnamon Tortoiseshell or Golden Tortoiseshell females. However, when done as a female Yellow carrying Cinnamon to a male Cinnamon, the result will still be Cinnamon Tortoiseshell and Golden Tortoiseshell females but the males will be Honey or Yellow. Honey females must inherit both Yellow and Cinnamon from both parents, e.g. when a Honey male, (or Yellow male carrying Cinnamon), is mated to a female who is Cinnamon Tortoiseshell, Golden Tortoiseshell carrying Cinnamon or Honey.

Variation	Genotype		
Female Honey	ppToTo	Male Honey	ppTo_

== Lilac ==
Lilac is a rare combination mutation that is not usually actively bred for anymore. It was once commonplace on the show table and loved by many for its beautiful pink hue. However, due to overbreeding the Lilac is no longer as popular, as its pink hues quickly turn brown.

Variation	Genotype
Lilac	dgdgpp

== Blonde ==
Blonde is a rarely seen mutation. It is a creamy blonde with an orange tint.

Variation	Genotype
Blonde	Lglg pp

== Copper ==
Copper is one of the two hardest mutations to achieve and is thought to be impossible to achieve in North America. It is a striking copper colour. Copper bred to Copper will produce all Copper, but the rarity of Copper makes finding a Copper pair nearly impossible. When trying to create Copper from two individuals that carry all the genes needed, there is a 1 in 85 chance of getting a Copper.

Variation	Genotype
Copper	U-eebbpp

== Blue Mink ==
Blue Mink is the other rarest and hardest mutation to find. It was found sometime after 1975.

Variation	Genotype
Blue Mink	UUeedgdgpp

== Mink ==
Mink is an uncommon three-combination colour. It is paler than Copper and Sable Chocolate.

Variation	Genotype
Mink	UUeepp

== Blue ==
Blue is made up of Black and the Dilute gene. It creates an animal that varies in shade from a deep blacky-blue to a very light powdery blue-grey.

Variation	Genotype
Blue	aadd

== Dove ==
Dove is a color mutation of the Syrian hamster, produced by combining specific recessive genes, typically Black and Cinnamon with a dove-brown or grayish-brownfur color.

Variation	Genotype
Dove	aapp

== Lavender ==
Lavender is made up from Black, Rust Gene and the Dilute gene. It creates a color similar to a purple all over the fur to the tips of the toes.

Variation	Genotype
Lavender	aabbdd

=== Opal ===
An opal coat color in Syrian hamsters is produced by the combination of Dilute (d) and Cream (e) genes, resulting in a soft blue-grey or slate-toned coat (often with subtle cream or warm undertones typical of the interaction) rather than the standard wild-type golden-brown.

Variation	Genotype
Opal	ddee

== Eyeless white hamsters ==
Eyeless white hamsters, genetically WhWh, occur when two hamsters are bred that carry the White Bellied gene (Wh). White Bellied is a specific gene and should not be confused with hamsters which have white fur on their bellies, i.e. White Banded hamsters (Baba or BaBa), Dominant Spotted hamsters (Dsds), or Recessive Dapples (rdrd). Eyeless white hamsters are more correctly called Anophthalmic whites and can survive well in spite of this. Hamsters do not rely on their eyesight as much as other mammals. They live below ground during the day and are active at twilight and near dawn, so it does not affect them much. The hamster relies heavily on scent and the detection of vibrations, as well as sound to some extent.

== Albino Syrian hamster ==
A true albino Syrian hamster has yet to be discovered; the closest is a Red-Eyed White (sometimes called a Flesh-Eared White).

== Eyes and ears ==
The colour of a hamster's eyes and ears is usually determined by the coat colour. Some coat colours have several different eye and ear colour combinations, however, such as the Cream variety which can have black, red or ruby eyes. Hamsters can also present with heterochromia, sometimes known as "odd eyes".

== Patterns ==
=== Banded ===
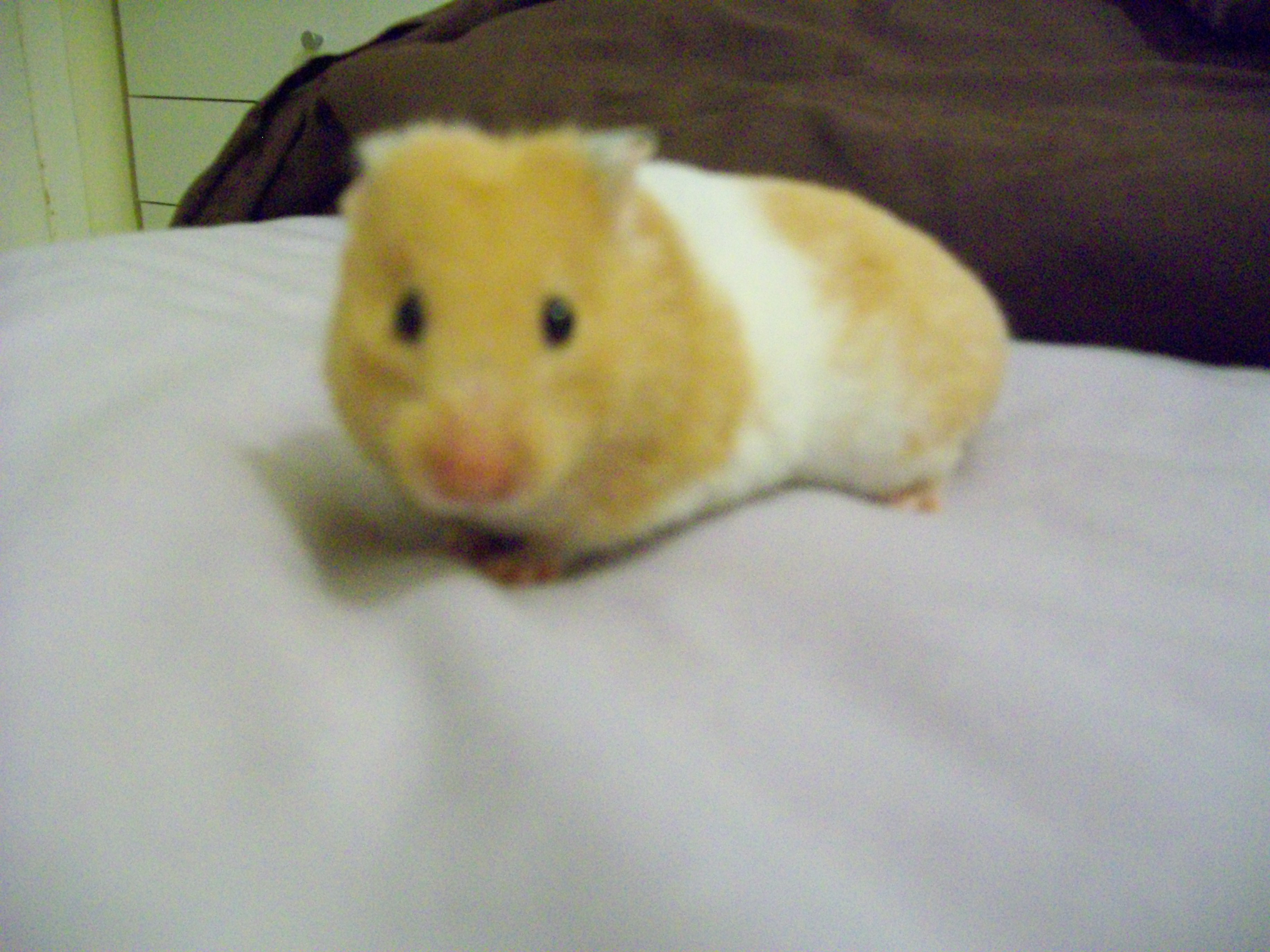
A female banded cream hamster

First reported in 1957, a Banded (BaBa, Baba, or Ba-) hamster will have a band of white around the middle. The width of the band will differ, from a small strip to most of the body. Most colours can exist Banded.

=== Piebald ===
The first Piebald was reported in 1945. A Piebald is a coloured hamster that has white spots on its body. The spots can be few and small or can cover the hamster. Piebalds can also have coloured bellies. This pattern is hard to breed and is believed by some to be extinct.

=== Dominant Spot ===
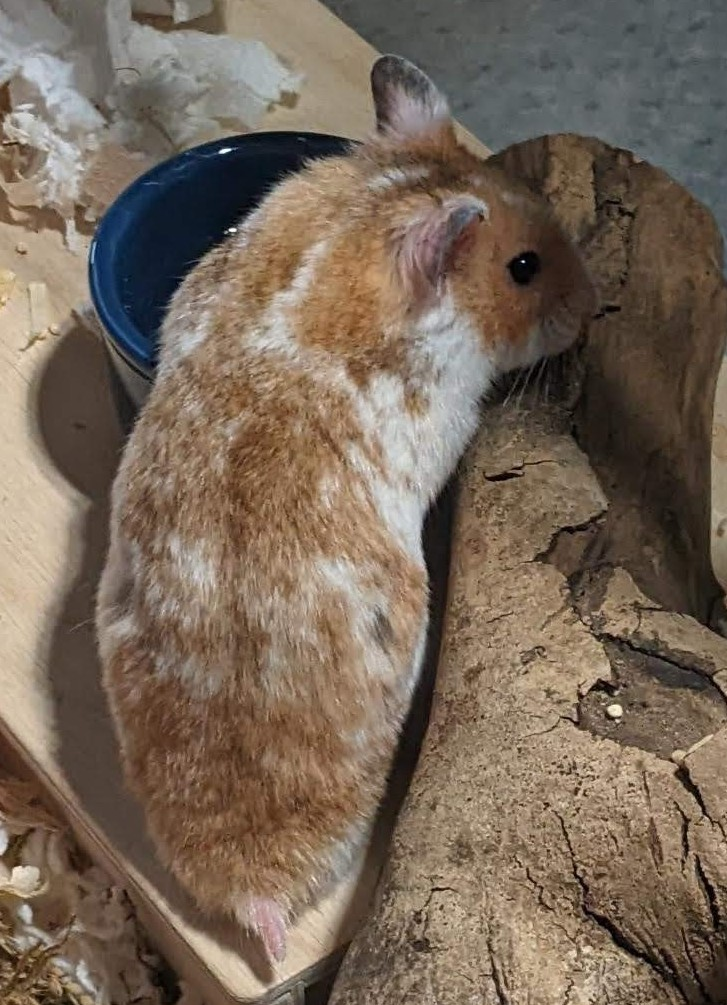
Male golden hamster with dominant spot pattern

The Dominant Spot (Dsds) variety was first discovered in the United States in 1964, and quickly became more popular than the Piebald variety due to it being easy to breed with fewer issues. The variety is described by UK and US standards as "a white animal with coloured spots".

=== Recessive Dappled ===
Recessive Dappled is an uncommon gene. It looks very similar to Dominant Spot. One of the classic tell-tale signs of Recessive Dapple is a Blaze up the forehead; however this is not a reliable way to tell because Dominant Spot also commonly has a blaze up the forehead.

=== Roan ===
The Roan (Whwh) pattern in Syrians consists of a white animal ticked with colour. The ticking is heavy around the head and give an evenly marbled appearance over the remainder of the top coat. The white areas are white to the roots. The coloured areas conform to the recognised coloured variety allowing for slight dilution. If a Roan is bred to another Roan or a White Bellied hamster, 25% of the litter will be eyeless whites.

=== Tortoiseshell ===
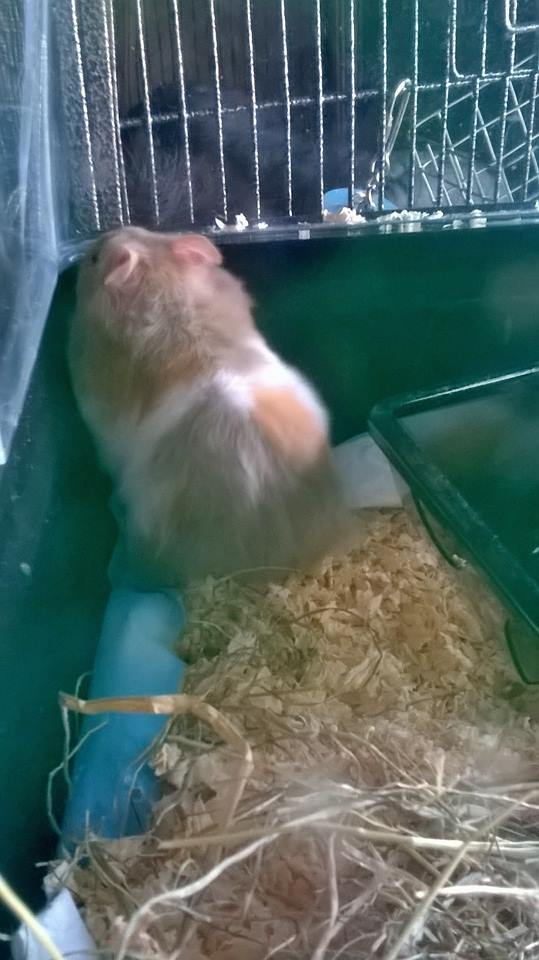
Dove banded long haired tortie

A Tortoiseshell (ToTo) is a bi-coloured animal that consists of a balanced pattern of coloured and yellow patches. These patches are clear and distinct with no brindling. Only females can be torties, as the pattern involves one copy of the sex-linked Yellow gene and one copy of the alternative non Yellow gene. Since female hamsters inherit a Yellow or non Yellow gene from each parent, whenever a Yellow and a non Yellow hamster are mated together, all the female offspring will be Tortoiseshell.

=== Tortoiseshell and White ===
Tortoiseshell and White (ToToBaba, ToToBaBa, or ToToDsds) is like tortoiseshell but with a white band or patches. They must have a white belly, since they have a white patterning gene, either Banded or Dominant Spot. Only female hamsters can be tortie and white, as the pattern involves one copy of the sex-linked Yellow gene and one copy of the alternative non Yellow gene.

=== Umbrous ===
Umbrous hamsters that carry the umbrous gene, a dominant darkening gene that adds a "sooty" or gray-brown overlay to their coat, making the coat look brushed with soot, and often deepens the topcoat, alters cheek flashes or side markings, and modifies the overall tone of the fur.

=== Cappuccino ===
Cappuccino is a rare, non-standard or informal descriptive trade name rather than a formally standardized genetic designation in official Syrian hamster standards used to describe Syrian hamsters with a warm, creamy-brown or multi-toned brownish-beige coat.

== Coat types ==
=== Shorthair (LL) ===
The first hamsters discovered were shorthairs. Shorthair hamsters simply have short hair.

=== Longhair (ll) ===
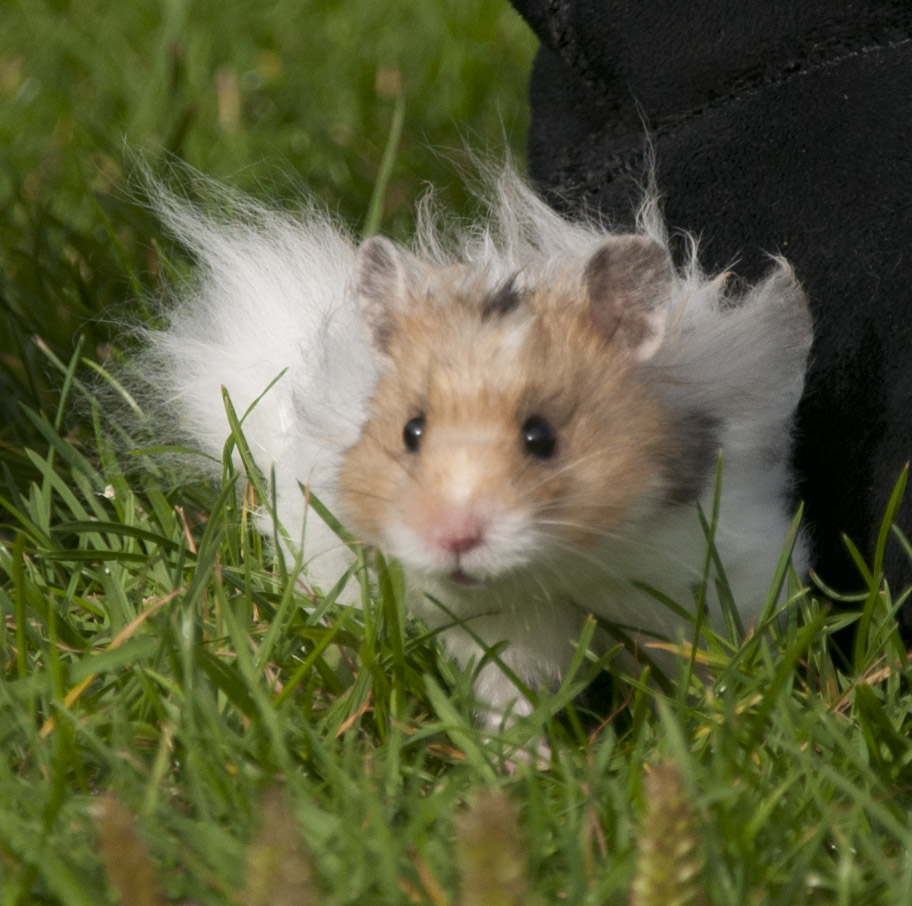
A male longhaired Syrian hamster

The longhair coat type is a hamster with hair that is up to 4 inches (10 cm). They are often referred to as "teddy bear hamsters" by pet stores due to their bear-like appearance and as a marketing tactic to sell them more easily.

Male Syrians usually have much longer hair than female Syrians. Hair is typically longer from the hips down, forming a 'skirt'.

=== Rex (rxrx) ===
The Rex coat modifier first appeared in 1970. It is a recessive gene, characterised mainly by short, curly whiskers. It can appear in both shorthaired and longhaired hamsters. The curls are more visible on the shorthaired and displays as a wavy coat on the longhaired hamsters. Because of the variance in curliness, the most foolproof way of knowing if a hamster is Rex is by looking at the whiskers.

=== Satin (Sasa) ===
These hamsters have smooth, shiny satin fur. Breeding two Satins together creates thin, greasy fur and is not recommended.
