= Hamster show =

Event where hamsters are competitively shown

Hamsters in pens for showing

A hamster show is an event in which people gather hamsters to judge them against each other. Hamster shows are also places where people share their enthusiasm for hamsters among attendees. Hamster shows feature an exhibition of the hamsters participating in the judging.

The judging of hamsters usually includes a goal of promoting hamsters that conform to natural or established varieties of hamsters. By awarding hamsters that match standard hamster types, hamster shows encourage planned and careful hamster breeding.

== Presentation ==
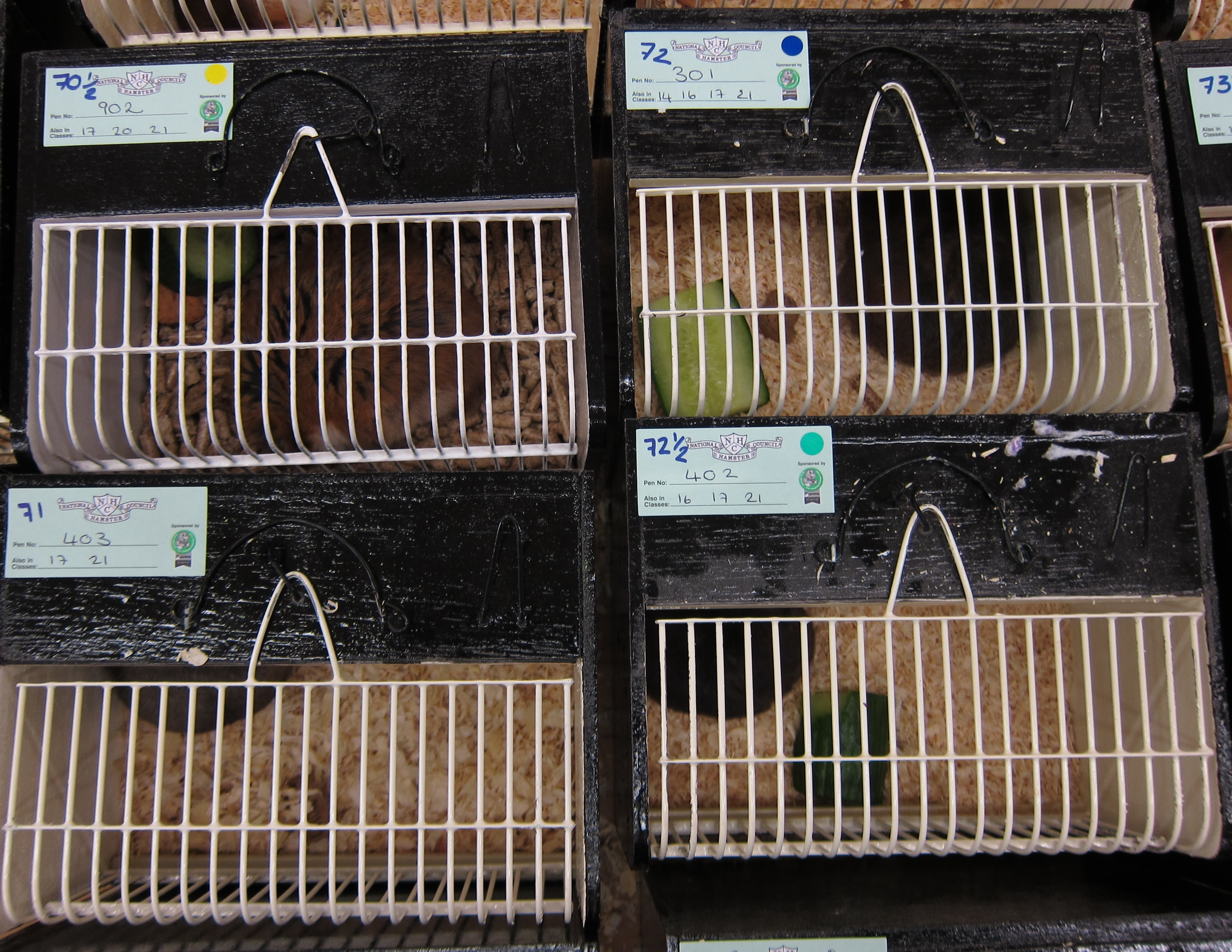
Hamsters at 2013 National Hamster Council show

Organizers of hamster shows will specify pen specifications. Usually competing hamsters must be in identical or similar plain pens to avoid influencing the judging or identifying the person presenting the hamster. Because pens are expensive, sometimes the organizers of a hamster show offer pens to be rented for the event. Standard show pens have open wire fronts, and are small for short-term exhibition only during the judging. Shorthaired hamsters may be shown on hamster bedding, while longhaired hamsters require something like wood-based cat litter which does not disturb fluffy fur. Water is usually not allowed, assuming that the judging is well-managed and quickly done; instead, the hamster may be given a juicy piece of fruit or vegetable. Standard hamster chow is not provided, because if the hamster stuffs its cheek pouches, judging becomes difficult or impossible.

Syrian hamsters are exhibited alone, as they are naturally solitary. Dwarf hamsters may be exhibited in pairs, as they are sometimes kept in groups of two, though it is not recommended. When a pair of dwarf hamsters is exhibited, but only one hamster is being judged, then the secretary managing records for the judges will keep notes identifying the hamster on exhibition. Show organizers may present dwarf hamsters in smaller pens than Syrians, or perhaps all hamsters will be in larger pens which are appropriate for Syrians.

Whereas shows for other animals commonly allow the manager to groom the animal after it is benched for presentation, in hamster shows judges commonly request the owners to stay completely away until the end of judging.

== Hamster show format ==
Hamster shows typically have three sections for entrants: pet hamsters, Syrian hamsters, and dwarf hamsters.

=== Pet hamster section ===
The pet hamster section is open to anyone who has a pet hamster. This section is not further divided, and all hamsters entering as pets are judged together. This is judging for amateurs which does not require entrants to prepare in advance. Typically, anyone may enter if they bring their hamster during the event before the judging. Hamsters entering as pets get an identification number, then are exhibited in the pet area to wait for judging.

The show judges evaluate pet hamsters on their tameness and health. In pet class, health issues that are considered are the body weight, the length of the teeth, length of toenails, and brightness of eyes. Pets that are well cared for all have an equal chance of winning in the division. Personal body conditions or disabilities, such as missing a leg or an eye, are not considered in the judging criteria so long as the hamster is otherwise in good condition.

Part of the process of pet judging is education for hamster owners. Hamster breeders and experienced hamster managers may be among the judges or at the event, and may talk with people entering their hamster in the pet class about hamster care and hamster issues.

=== Syrian and dwarf hamster sections ===
Syrian and dwarf hamsters are each divided into their own sections. From there, each is divided within that section into "straight class", "duplicate class", and "non-standard class". "Straight" class refers to hamsters that are a standard presentation of an established variety, and in the straight class, entrants are judged in a subclass against other hamsters of that variety. For example, all Syrian hamsters that have the natural agouti coloration of the wild hamster are commonly placed in their own subclass of the straight division. "Duplicate class" is a division determined by characteristics of the human entering the hamster as well as by the hamster. To be in duplicate class, a hamster must also be in a straight class. From there, the hamster's manager is sorted according to their professionalism, with novices, breeders, and perhaps others being in separate duplicate classes. The duplicate class is used to select "best in show" winners. For example, there might be a "best in show" hamster selected for each subclass in the duplicate class (novice, breeder) and the best hamster might be any hamster with the highest score in any subclass of the straight class division. A third division is non-standard class, which can include any hamsters that do not conform to any standard color or variation and that cannot be directly compared with other hamsters in a straight class. Non-standard class hamsters are not typically sorted also into the duplicate class, and are not typically eligible for consideration as "best in show".

== Judging ==
Judging may begin after all hamsters are presented in the exhibition pens. Judges remove a hamster from its pen and examine it on a "judging frame". A judging frame is a raised, enclosed platform with a wire mesh or transparent bottom which allows the judge to look at the hamster from below and inspect its belly fur. After visual inspection the judge will examine the hamster by touch. This includes stroking the fur to measure the softness and feeling the hamster to assess its condition and size. The back and tail are checked for straightness and the tail is further checked for kinks.

In a 100-point judging scheme, a common allocation of points is as follows:

- color and markings - 30 points
- conformation to body type - 25 points
- fur - 20 points
- size - 10 points
- condition - 10 points
- ears and eyes - 5 points

"Color and markings" has the most points because emphasizing this encourages care and organization in breeding by ensuring that establish varieties of hamsters persist without becoming diluted in the gene pool. Hamsters in straight classes have their colors judged against established, historical models for that class. Fur can influence this class, as longer hamster hair tends to make a hamster look lighter in color. "Type" refers to conformation of body type to the ideal hamster. Wild hamsters have broad bodies, heads that are large in proportion to the body, a short face, and blunt nose. Indiscriminate breeding can produce hamsters that vary from the wild type, and type judging preserves what is natural or established. "Fur" should be dense and soft. A common shortcoming for bred hamsters is thin belly fur. Among longhaired hamsters, there must be consideration that males have thicker, denser long hair than females, and each sex should be judged according to what is expected of that sex and not what is typical for the other. Similarly, "size" judging should take into account that females are larger than males. Size judging includes making an experienced judgement of whether a hamster is under- or overweight, and in either of those cases, points would be deducted. "Condition" is a check of health, including any dry skin, oily fur, long nails, or long teeth. "Ears and eyes" judging checks for round ears without nicks, ears that are held up and alert, and eyes that are bright and not runny or closed.

Training to become a judge for hamster shows typically takes two years, and would include attending hamster shows to watch judging and taking advice from hamster clubs.

== Show organization ==
Hamster shows are frequently presented by an organization that promotes hamster appreciation, such as a hamster club. Typically, hamster clubs will have a show manager who takes responsibility for organizing or promoting hamster shows for the club members and general public.

Organizations that present hamster shows include the following:

- California Hamster Association
- National Hamster Council and its regional branches:
  - Midland Hamster Club
  - Northern Hamster Club
  - Southern Hamster Club
