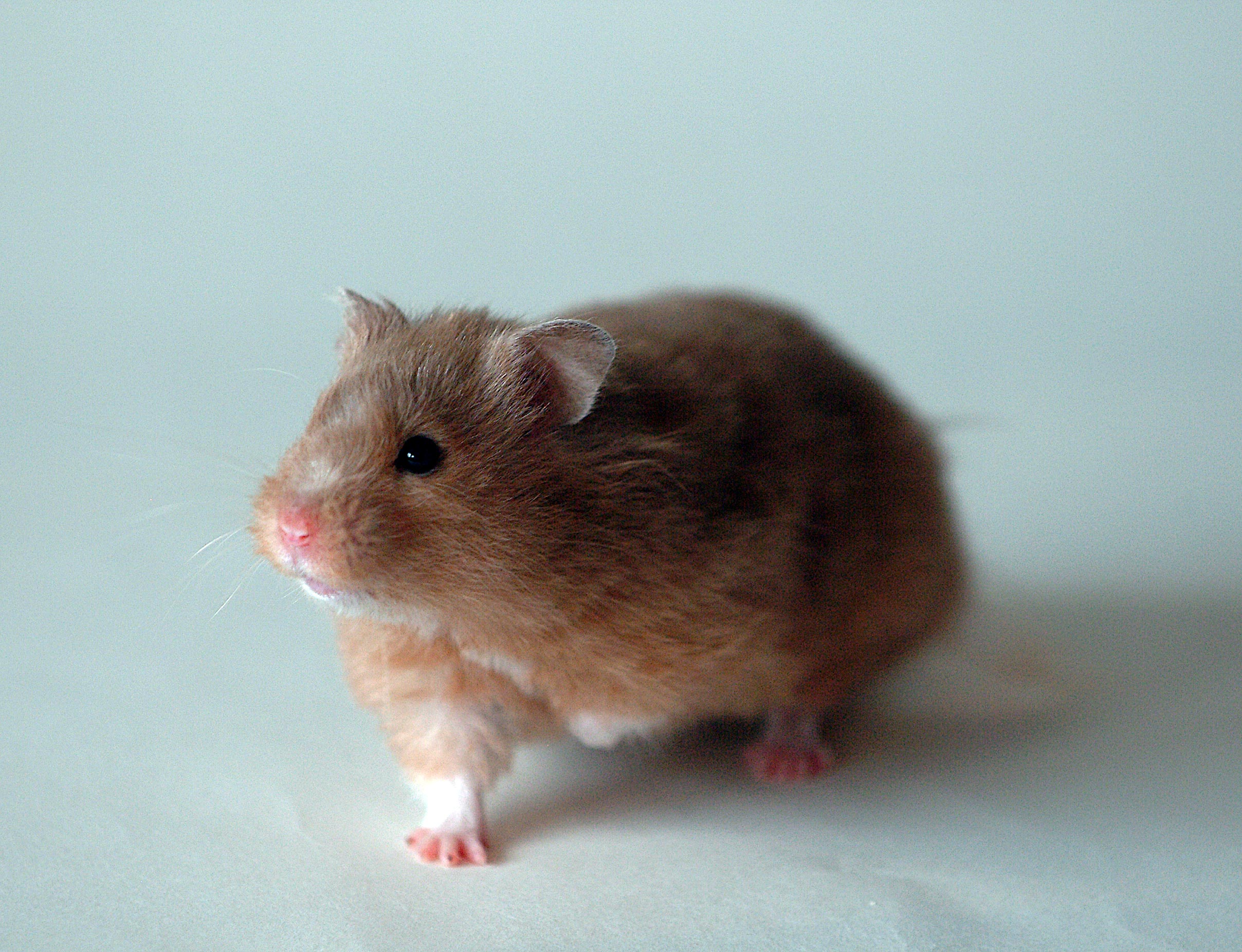
- A domestic female golden hamster

Conservation status
- Endangered (IUCN 3.1)

Scientific classification
- Kingdom: Animalia
- Phylum: Chordata
- Class: Mammalia
- Order: Rodentia
- Family: Cricetidae
- Subfamily: Cricetinae
- Genus: Mesocricetus
- Species: M. auratus

Binomial name
- Mesocricetus auratus (Waterhouse, 1839)

Synonyms
- Cricetus auratus Waterhouse, 1839

= Golden hamster =

Species of hamster

The golden hamster or Syrian hamster (Mesocricetus auratus) is a rodent belonging to the hamster subfamily, Cricetinae. Their natural geographical range is in an arid region of northern Syria and southern Turkey. Their numbers have been declining in the wild due to a loss of habitat from agriculture and deliberate elimination by humans. Thus, wild golden hamsters are now considered endangered by the International Union for Conservation of Nature. However, captive breeding programs are well established, and captive-bred golden hamsters are often kept as small house pets. They are also used as scientific research animals.

Syrian hamsters kept as pets are sensitive to their housing conditions, and many welfare concerns have been identified in association with inadequate care. Major concerns include undersized cages, the presence of predatory species (dogs and cats) in the hamster's environment, insufficient substrate depth, excessive handling, noise, and wet tail (proliferative ileitis), the risk of which is increased by poor hygiene and cage cleanliness and high levels of stress.

Syrian hamsters are larger than many of the dwarf hamsters kept as pocket pets (up to five times larger), though the wild European hamster exceeds Syrian hamsters in size.

== Characteristics ==
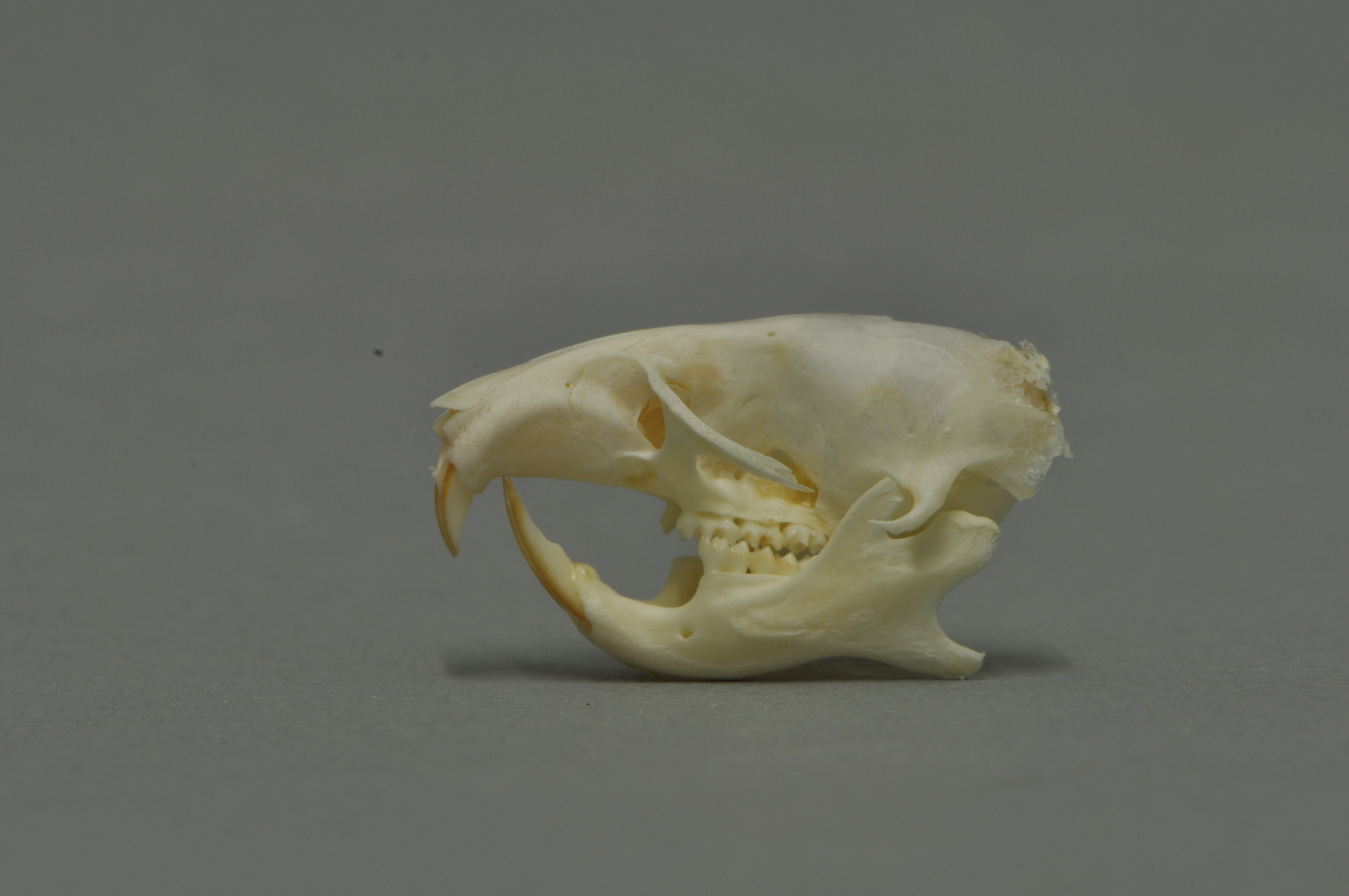
Skull of a golden hamster

Adult golden hamsters can reach around 7.1 in (18 cm) long. Females are usually larger than males, with a body mass of around 100–150 grams (3.5–5.3 oz) and lifespan of 1.5–2 years. Syrian hamsters from private breeders can be in the range of 175–225 grams (6.2–7.9 oz).

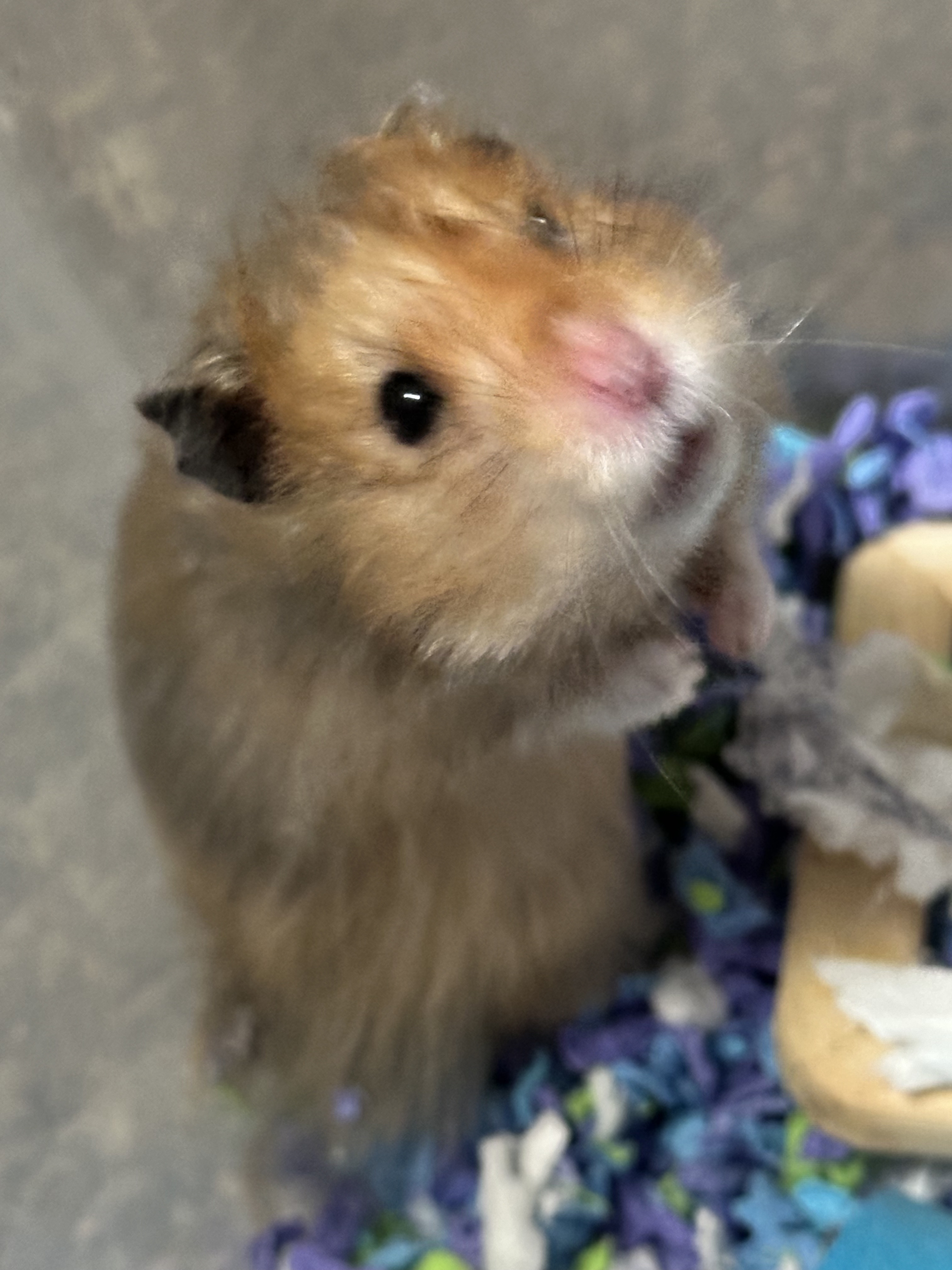
Male golden hamster standing up

Like most members of the subfamily, the golden hamster has expandable cheek pouches, which extend from its cheeks to its shoulders. In the wild, hamsters are larder hoarders; they use their cheek pouches to transport food to their burrows. Their name in the local Arabic dialect where they were found roughly translates to "mister saddlebags" (Arabic: أبو جراب) due to the amount of storage space in their cheek pouches.

Sexually mature female hamsters come into heat (estrus) every four days. Golden hamsters and other species in the genus Mesocricetus have the shortest gestation period in any known placental mammal at around 16 days. Gestation has been known to last up to 21 days, but this is rare and almost always results in complications. They can produce large litters of 20 or more young, although the average litter size is between eight and 10 pups. If a mother hamster is inexperienced or feels threatened, she may abandon or eat her pups. A female hamster enters estrus almost immediately after giving birth, and can become pregnant despite already having a litter. This act puts stress on the mother's body and often results in very weak and undernourished young.

== Discovery ==
Golden hamsters originate from Syria and were first described by scientists in the 1797 second edition of The Natural History of Aleppo, a book written and edited by two Scottish physicians living in Syria. The Syrian hamster was then recognized as a distinct species in 1839 by British zoologist George Robert Waterhouse, who named it Cricetus auratus or the "golden hamster". The skin of the holotype specimen is kept at the Natural History Museum in London.

In 1930, Israel Aharoni, a zoologist and professor at the Hebrew University of Jerusalem, captured a mother hamster and her litter of pups in Aleppo, Syria. The hamsters were bred in Jerusalem as laboratory animals.

Descendants of the captive hamsters were shipped to Britain in 1931, where they came under the care of the Wellcome Bureau of Scientific Research. These bred and two more pairs were given to the Zoological Society of London in 1932. The descendants of these were passed on to private breeders in 1937.

In 1946, Albert Marsh began the first commercial hamster breeding business, Gulf Hamstery, to promote the Syrian hamster as pets and laboratory animals.

A separate stock of hamsters was exported from Syria to the United States in 1971, but mitochondrial DNA studies have established that all domestic golden hamsters are descended from one female – likely the one captured in 1930 in Syria.

Since the species was named, the genus Cricetus has been subdivided and this species (together with several others) was separated into the genus Mesocricetus, leading to the currently accepted scientific name for the golden hamster of Mesocricetus auratus.

== Behavior ==
A solitary species, Syrian hamsters are very territorial and intolerant of each other; attacks against each other are commonplace. Exceptions do occur, usually when a female and male meet when the female is in heat, but even so, the female may attack the male after mating. In captivity, babies are separated from their mother and by sex after four weeks, as they sexually mature at four to five weeks old. Same-sex groups of siblings can stay with each other until they are about eight weeks old, at which point they will become territorial and fight with one another, sometimes to the death. Infanticide is not uncommon among female golden hamsters. In captivity, they may kill and eat healthy young as a result of the pups interacting with humans, as any foreign scent is treated as a threat. Females also eat their dead young in the wild.

Golden hamsters mark their burrows with secretions from special scent glands on their hips called flank glands. Male hamsters in particular lick their bodies near the glands, creating damp spots on the fur, then drag their sides along objects to mark their territory. Females also use bodily secretions and feces.

=== Socialization ===
Syrian hamsters acquire learned helplessness when they are bullied a few times by a larger animal. They can regain lost confidence if they are not bullied for some time.

Interactions between male and female Syrian hamsters are influenced by the estrous cycle - in addition, their behavior changes over the course of the four-day cycle. Parameters for interactions that have been studied include sniffing, approaching, leaving, and following each other (male/female pair). Specific to the male hamster, his response to the female can be measured by mounting behavior, intromission and ejaculation.

Under semi-natural conditions, the mating behaviors of male and female hamsters were observed over the four days of the estrous cycle. When allowed free interaction, females displayed lordosis in their own living area 93% of the time. After 60 minutes of copulation, the female would force the male out while she retrieved his food supply and aggressively forced him into the corner farthest away from her nest.

When a Syrian hamster is introduced to a new hamster in its own cage, it performs a fixed action pattern consisting of a sequence of acts and postures that are agonistic by nature. It has been observed from posture that one hamster becomes dominant and the other submissive; it is usually the new hamster that emerges dominant.

=== Feeding ===
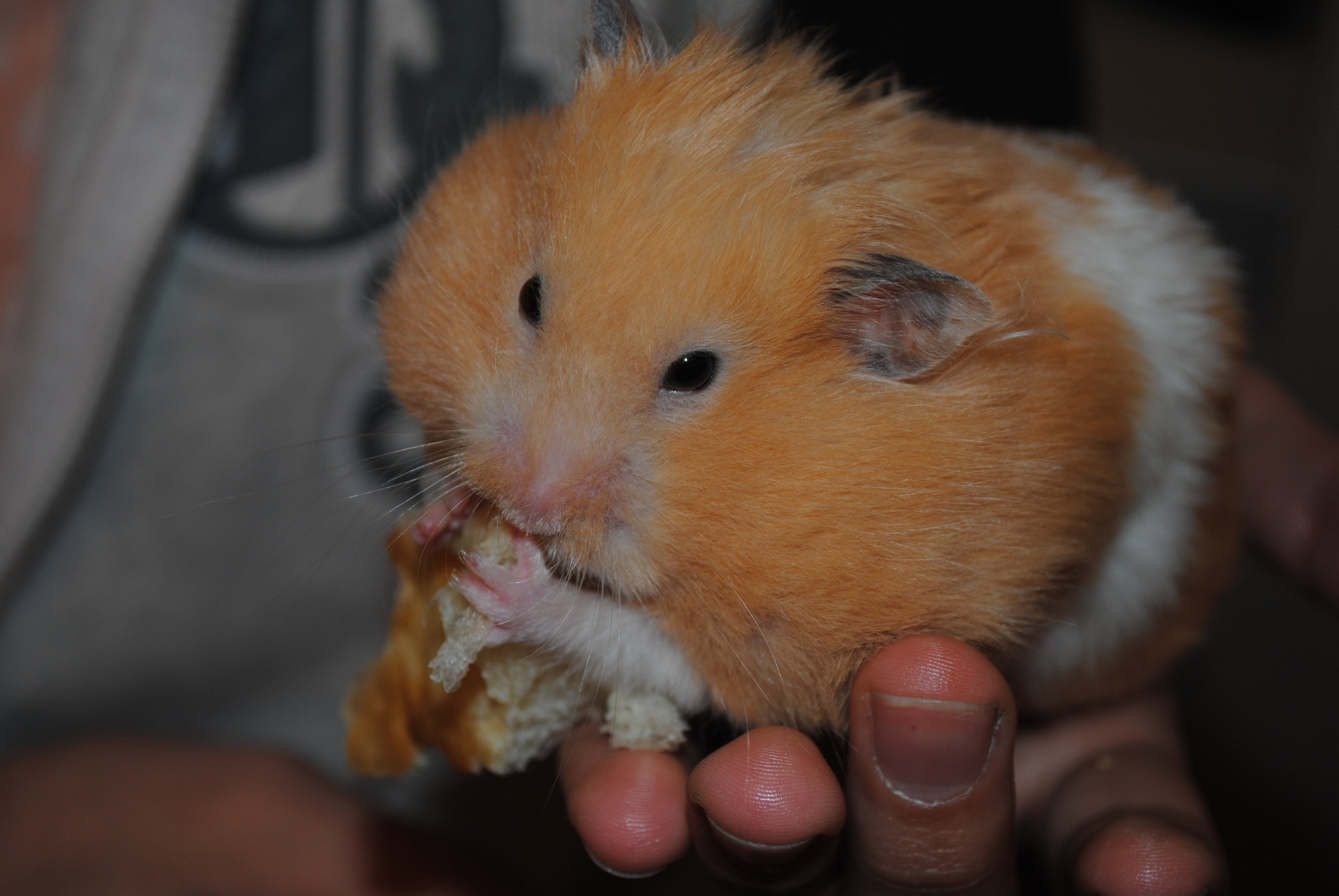
Golden hamster filling its cheek pouches with food

Under typical laboratory conditions, Syrian hamsters apparently do not exhibit food-anticipatory activity (FAA) – that is, when on a restricted feeding schedule where food is given at specific times of day, they do not demonstrate increased wheel-running prior to feeding time. This is in contrast to most other rodents. However, standard laboratory conditions include bright light during the daytime; when subjected to a light cycle simulating dawn and dusk with darkness during the day, they do exhibit the behavior. The arcuate, ventromedial and dorsomedial nuclei are all involved in FAA in Syrian hamsters.

In a study of their food-hoarding behavior, Syrian hamsters were given access to food for only limited periods of time. It was expected that they would consume more in each sitting than usual; instead, they exhibited hoarding behavior, taking the food during the given time period and then continuously eating it the rest of the time as though they were on a free-fed schedule. This allowed them to maintain typical body weight, and mimic the adaptive feeding strategies they may use in their natural habitats.

Females have shown signs of anorexia and anxiety when separated from social interactions. Social separation of hamsters has a bias toward females, thus providing a model for the differences between sexes when experiencing anorexia and anxiety in their adulthood.

=== Sleep ===
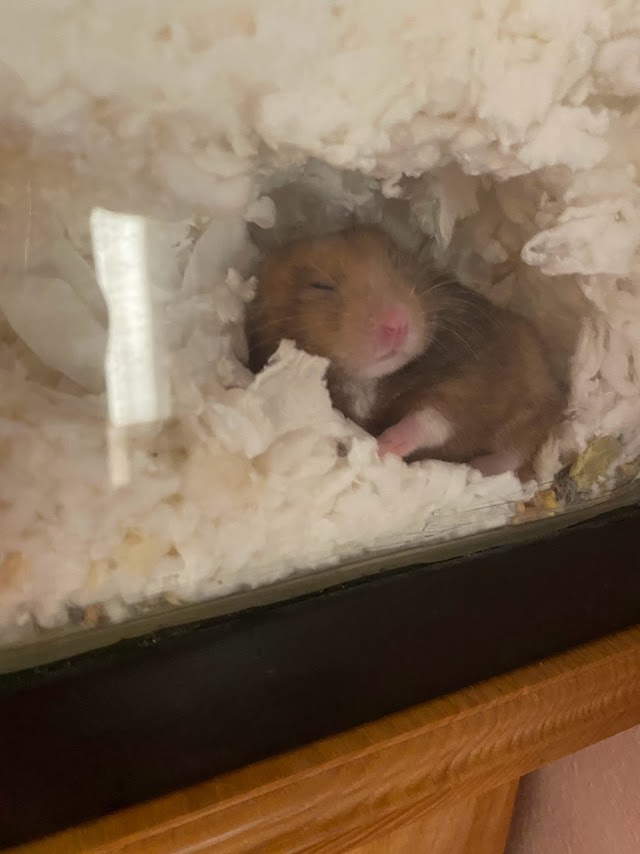
Syrian hamster burrowed in its bedding

The sleep cycle of the Syrian hamster lasts approximately 10–12 minutes.

In the laboratory, Syrian hamsters are observed to be nocturnal and in their natural circadian rhythm they wake and sleep on a consistent schedule. In all kinds of laboratory settings hamsters do 80% of their routine activities at night. They are most active early in the night, and become less active as the night passes.

The sleeping behavior of wild hamsters is not well understood; a study found that in the wild, Syrian hamsters are active almost exclusively during the daytime, contrary to observations in the laboratory.

=== Reproduction ===
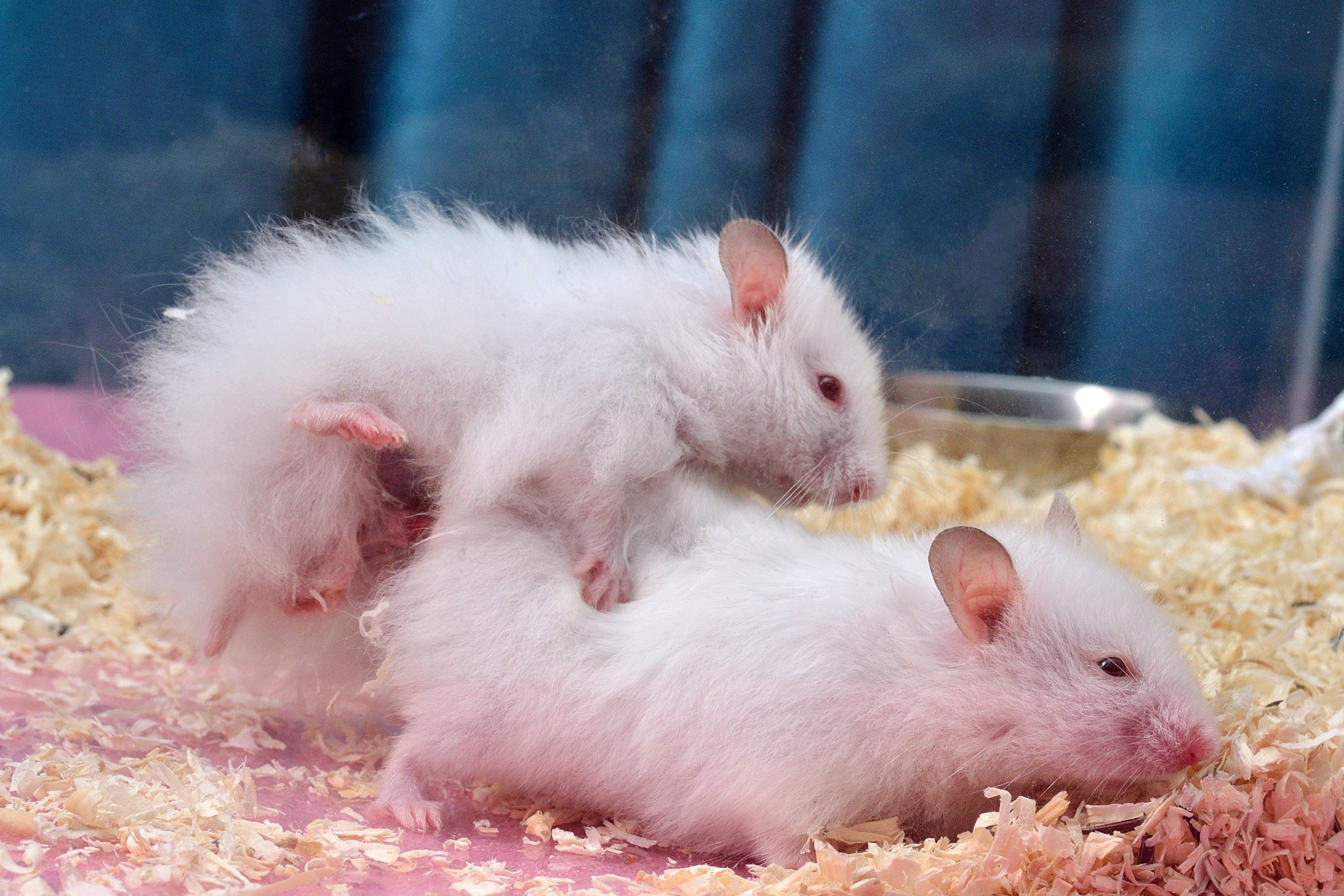
Syrian hamsters mating

The female Syrian hamster has anatomic features that are unique from other animals. They mature between 8–10 weeks of age and have a 4-day estrous cycle.

Female Syrian hamsters show mate preference before they engage in copulation by displaying vaginal marking, known to solicit males. She often chooses to mate with an alpha male, who will flank mark (a scent-marking behavior associated with aggression and competition) more frequently than any subordinate males present.

Male offspring are at higher risk than female offspring of enduring effects from maternal social stress. In the presence of a dominant pregnant female, subordinate pregnant female hamsters have the ability to reabsorb or spontaneously abort their young (most often males) in utero. The subordinate females produce smaller litters overall, and any male offspring they do produce will be smaller in size than those that were produced by the dominant female. After a mother hamster gives birth, normal behavior from the mother in the postpartum period can include establishing a maternal bond with the babies, the mother being aggressive to protect the babies, or infanticide in rodents of the mother to her young.

The male Syrian hamster has a requirement for both hormonal cues and chemosensory cues in order to engage in copulation. Further, the integration of steroid cues (i.e. testosterone) and odour cues (relayed through the olfactory bulb) is crucial for mating. It has also been shown that within the medial amygdala, the anterior and posterior regions work together to process the stimuli (odors), showing that their mating behavior relies on the main olfactory system's communication to nuclei in the amygdala regions. Their behavior has demonstrated this phenomenon, as they are attracted to the odor of female hamster's vaginal discharge. Males have even demonstrated mounting behavior on other males who are scented with the female vaginal discharge.

When one male and two females are placed in the same environment, the male is likely to engage in copulation with both females as it provides him with a reproductive advantage. In all observed scenarios where there was one male and two females, he did not demonstrate preference for either female and engaged in copulation with both the females present. There has been no reproductive disadvantage to the female when another female is present, other than decreased stimulation as compared to a one-male one-female situation.

=== In captivity ===
Gnawing at cage wires is considered an indicator of reduced welfare in captive Syrian hamsters. Almost all hamsters display wire-gnawing behavior in laboratory cages, regardless of cage size, but gnawing increases as cage size decreases. Additionally, a hamster in a smaller cage will use the roof of their house as a platform more often than a hamster in a larger cage, which may suggest they feel the need to use the extra space when floor space is restricted.

In three groups of hamsters housed with 10, 40 and 80 cm of bedding, those with 10 cm of bedding exhibited significantly more wire-gnawing than the other two groups, and generally did not construct their own burrows (preferring to sleep in pre-made shelters). All hamsters with 40 or 80 cm of bedding constructed and used burrows similar to those built by wild Syrian hamsters. Animals in the 40 cm group showed minimal wire-gnawing, and those in the 80 cm group did not gnaw the wires at all.

== Survival in the wild ==
Following Professor Aharoni's collection in 1930, only infrequent sightings and captures were reported in the wild. Finally, to confirm the current existence of the wild golden hamster in northern Syria and southern Turkey, two expeditions were carried out in September 1997 and March 1999. The researchers found and mapped 30 burrows. None of the inhabited burrows contained more than one adult. The team caught six females and seven males. One female was pregnant and gave birth to six pups. All these 19 caught golden hamsters, together with three wild individuals from the University of Aleppo, were shipped to Germany to form a new breeding stock.

Observations of females in this wild population have revealed, contrary to laboratory populations, that activity patterns are crepuscular rather than nocturnal, possibly to avoid nocturnal predators such as owls.

== As research animals ==
Video showing the gait of a lab-bred hamster from the underside

Golden hamsters are used to model human medical conditions including various cancers, metabolic diseases, non-cancer respiratory diseases, cardiovascular diseases, infectious diseases, and general health concerns. In 2006 and 2007, golden hamsters accounted for 19% of the total Animal Welfare Act-covered animal research subjects in the United States. They have also been studied as models for the development of the palate and incidence of cleft palate, the influence of retinoic acid on physical malformations in fetuses, immune responses to diseases like hookworm, and the effects of ingesting ethanol solution on liver composition and fatty acid accumulation.

Rocky Mountain Laboratories used Syrian hamsters for disease transmission research. SARS-CoV-2 transmits efficiently in Syrian hamsters.

== As pets ==
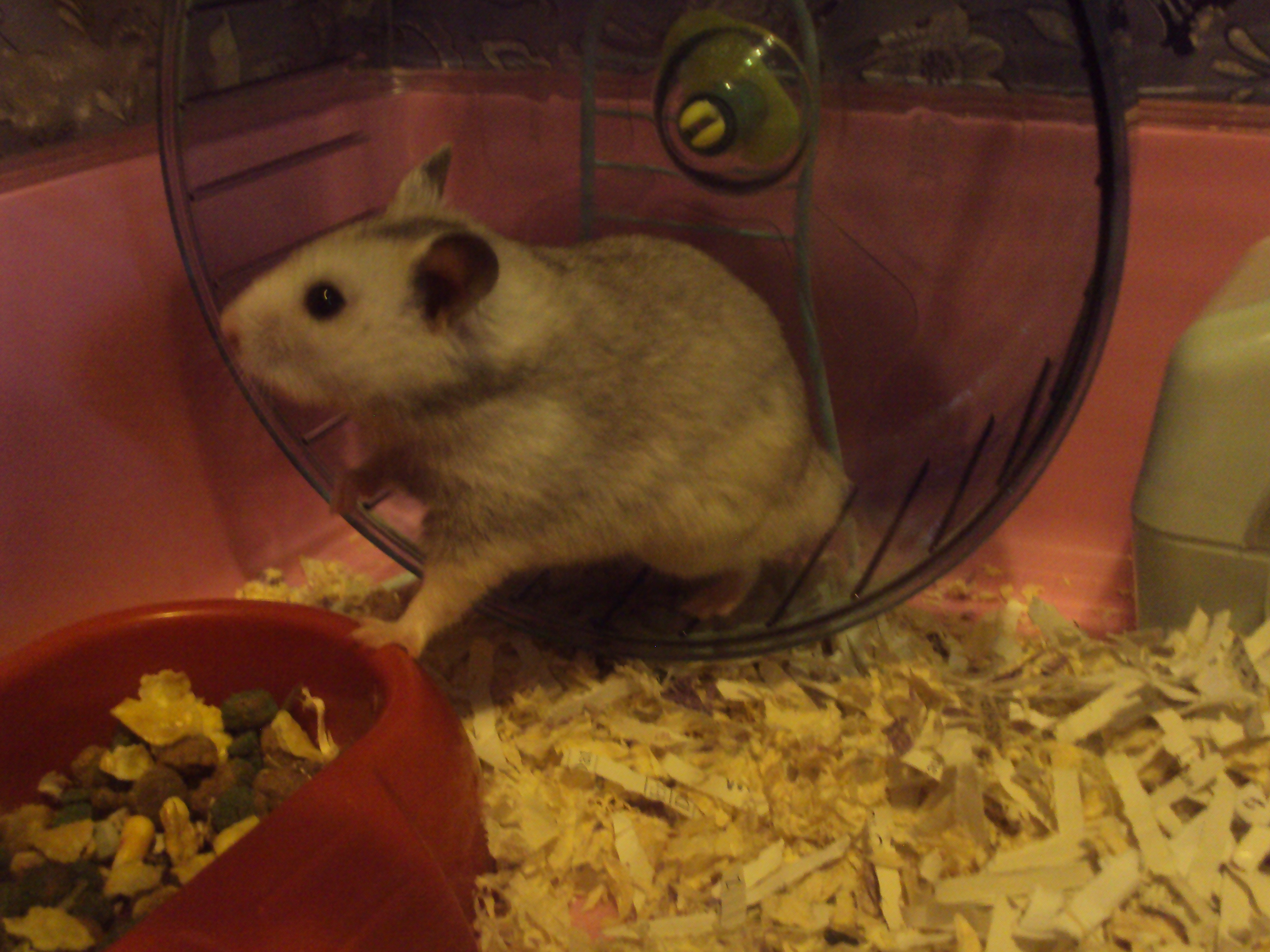
A golden hamster listening from its plastic exercise wheel

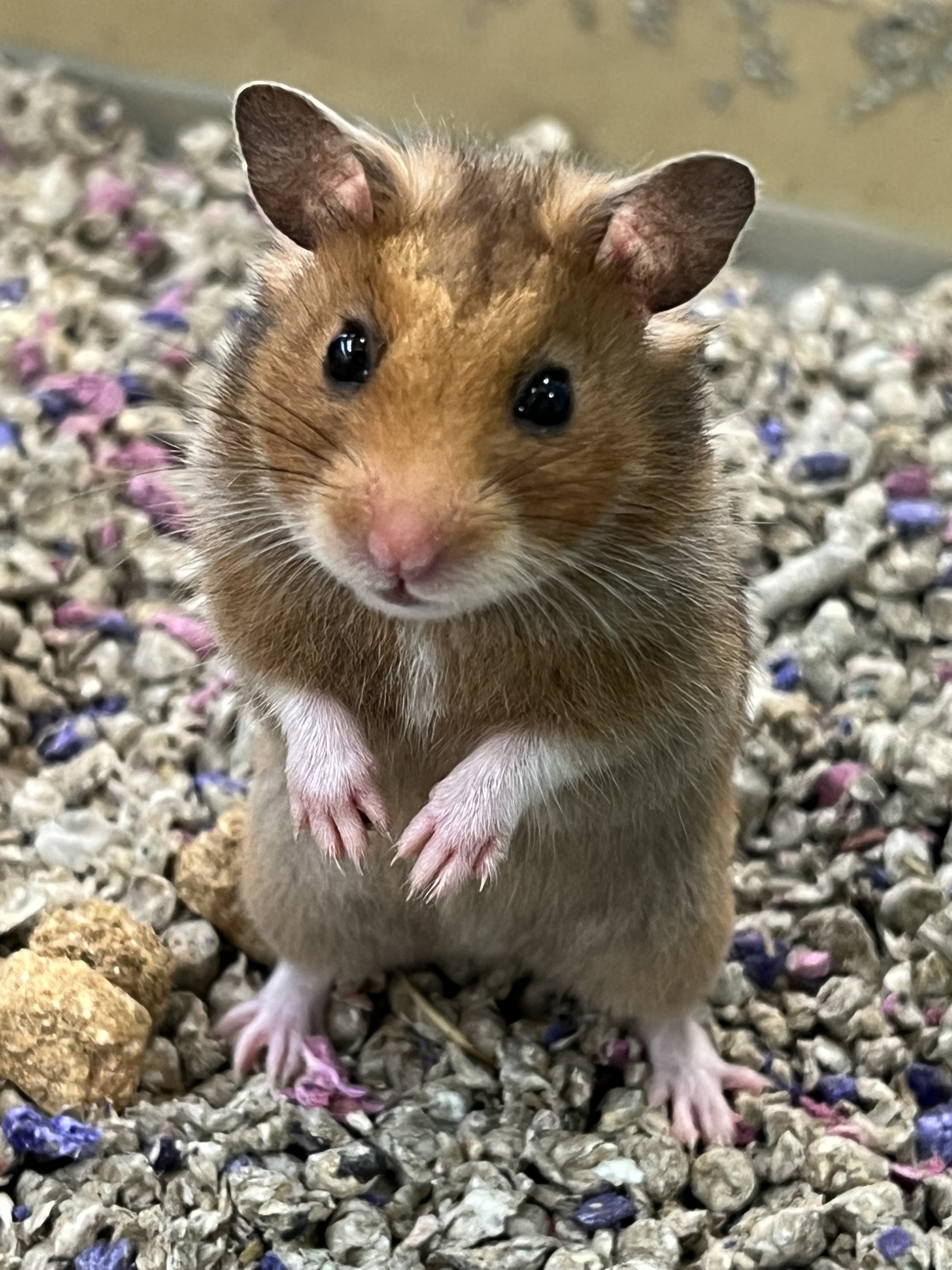
A young female golden hamster for sale at a pet store in the United States

Golden hamsters are popular as house pets due to their docile, inquisitive nature, cuteness, and small size. However, these animals have some special requirements that must be met for them to be healthy. Although some people think of them as a pet for young children, the American Society for the Prevention of Cruelty to Animals recommends hamsters as pets only for people over age 6 and the child should be supervised by an adult. Cages should be a suitable size, safe, comfortable, and interesting. If a hamster is constantly chewing or climbing on the bars of its cage, then it needs more stimulation or a larger enclosure. The recommended size for a hamster cage is 1 square metre (1,600 sq in), of continuous floor space or larger. These can be made by cutting and connecting large plastic storage bins, or by using a large glass aquarium. Appropriately sized wooden enclosures can be made, or bought online. The majority of hamster cages sold in pet stores do not meet these size requirements. Hamster Society Singapore (HHS) recommends a minimum of 4,000 square centimetres (620 sq in) for Syrian hamsters, while Tierärztliche Vereinigung für Tierschutz (TVT) recommends giving them as much space as you can and at minimum 100 cm × 50 cm × 50 cm (L × W × H) which is 5,000 cm^{2} (780 sq in).

A hamster wheel is a common type of environmental enrichment, and it is important that hamsters have a wheel in their cage. TVT recommends wheels should be at least 30 cm for Syrian hamsters, since smaller diameters lead to permanent spinal curvatures, especially in young animals. They also recommend a solid running surface because rungs or mesh can cause injury, or bumblefoot. A hamster should be able to run on its wheel without arching its back. A hamster that has to run with an arched back can have back pain and spine problems. A variety of toys and cardboard tubes and boxes can help to provide enrichment, as they are energetic and need space to exercise.

Most hamsters in American and British pet stores are Syrian hamsters. Originally, Syrian hamsters occurred in just one color – the natural wild agouti – but they have since developed a variety of color and pattern mutations, including cream, white, blonde, cinnamon, tortoiseshell, black, three different shades of gray, dominant spot, banded, and dilute. Selective breeding has also produced a variety of coat types such as long-haired, satin, and rex.

== Breeding ==
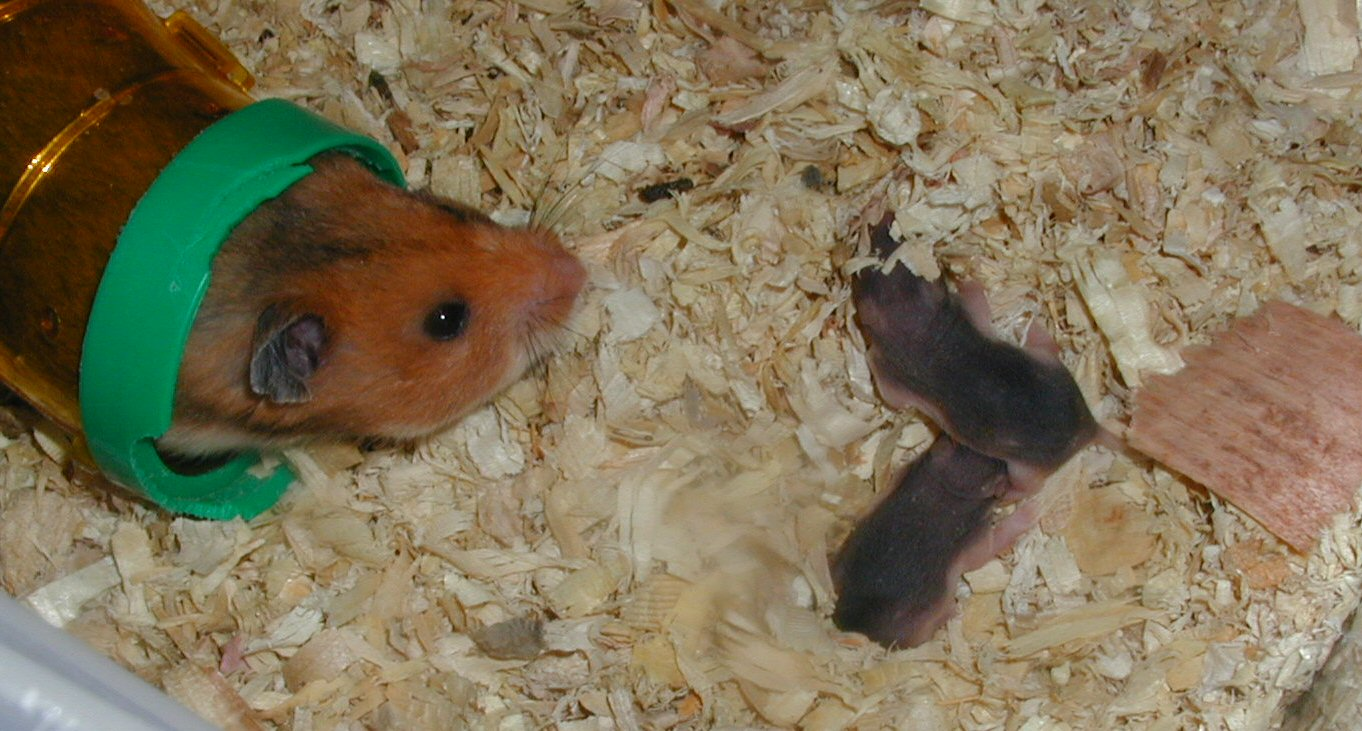
A hamster mother emerging from a tube to see her two young, which are less than a week old

The practice of selective breeding of golden hamsters requires an understanding of their care, knowledge about breed variations, a plan for selective breeding, scheduling of the female body cycle, and the ability to manage a colony of hamsters.

=== Breed variations ===
Often long-haired hamsters are referred to by their nickname "teddy bear". They are identical to short-haired Syrians except for the hair length and can be found in any color, pattern, or other coat type available in the species. Male long-haired hamsters usually have longer fur than the female, culminating in a "skirt" of longer fur around their backsides. Long-haired females have a much shorter coat although it is still significantly longer than that of a short-haired female.

== See also ==
- Martin R. Ralph (for experiments done with golden hamsters and their circadian rhythms)
