= Flank gland =

The flank gland is one of several specialized caudolateral glands (a group of glands located along the sides and the rear) found predominately in certain species of rodents, including voles, shrews, hamsters, and other members of the family Cricetidae.

The flank gland is located laterally on each side of the abdomen. It is often present in both males and females, though this varies by species, and is usually larger in males. In some species, self-scratching of the flank gland, typically with a hind foot, causes secretion of an oily substance that leaves the surrounding hair visibly matted and emits a chemical odor. These chemicals vary in composition within the same species, as well as within an individual as it progresses through sexual maturity. Scent marking via secretions of the flank gland has been observed: for example, some male microtine rodents will perform “drum-marking,” in which they repeatedly scratch their flank gland with their foot and proceed to stomp the ground several times.

In dominant individuals, the matting of fur at the location of secretion is more conspicuous than in subordinate individuals, suggesting it serves as some visual signal. There is also experimental evidence of male golden hamsters and of lab rats fighting, after which the victor will scent-mark more than the submitter: this suggests it is used by dominant individuals to establish territory. There is evidence that rodents can remember odors of individuals and discriminate between those that are familiar and those that are not, even when the chemical qualities of the odors are very similar; however, they are not able to discriminate between non-familiar kin and non-kin. Additionally, female golden hamsters show a sexual preference towards familiar non-kin odors. Flank gland size varies between individuals, though studies concerning a correlation between size of flank gland and reproductive success in males give conflicting results.
