= National Hamster Council =

Animal organization based in the United Kingdom

- Abbreviation: NHC
- Formation: 1949
- Type: pet organization
- Chairperson: Andrew Bryan
- Vice Chairperson: Mark Harris
- Website: Official website

The National Hamster Council (NHC) is an organization of hamster pet owners in the United Kingdom.

== History ==
The council was established in 1949. Its purpose is to represent and promote the welfare, keeping, exhibition, and responsible breeding of all five species of pet hamsters.

== Clubs ==
There are three regional clubs under the council, which are:

- Northern Hamster Club
- Midland Hamster Club
- Southern Hamster Club
