= Domestication of the Syrian hamster =

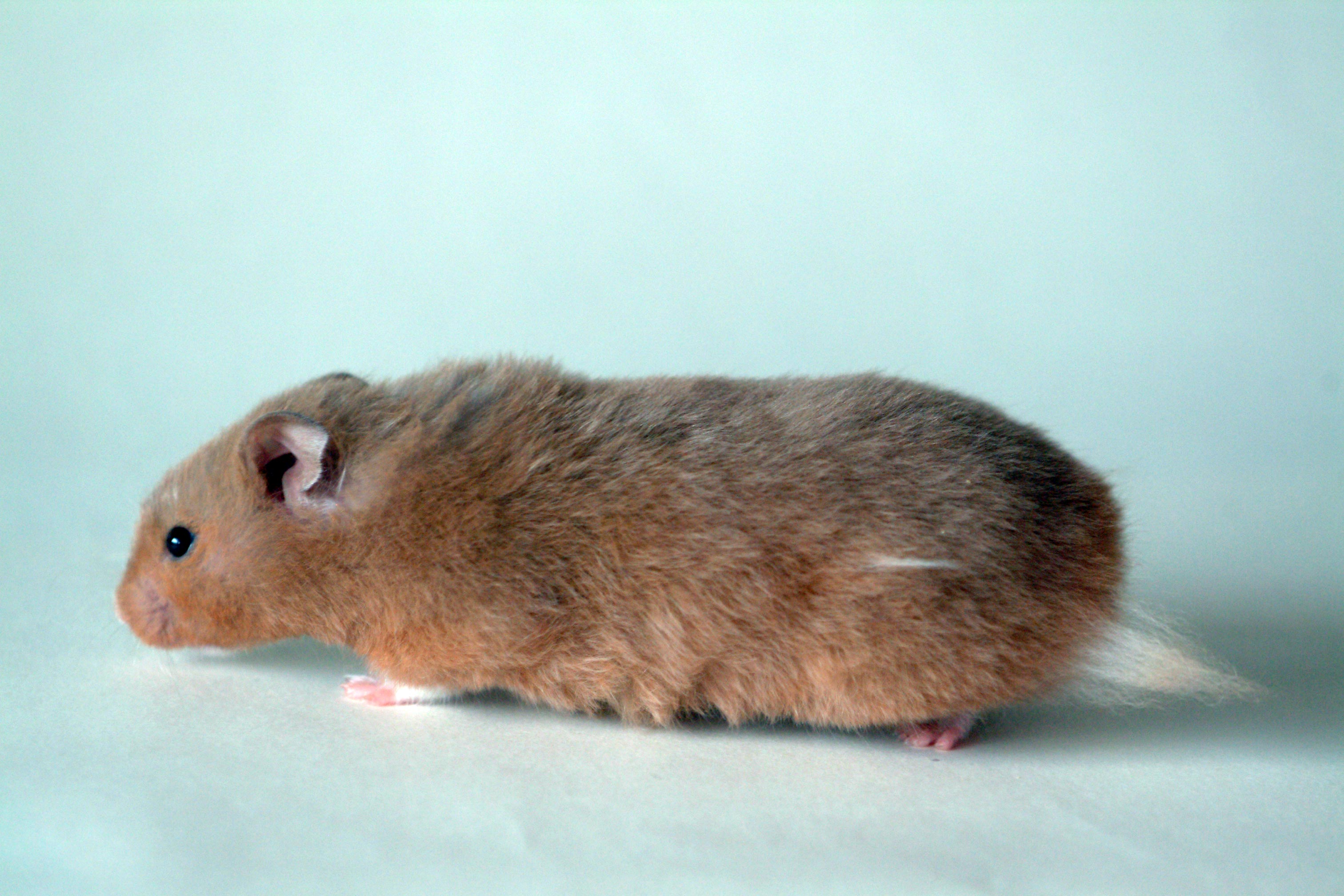
Syrian hamster, Mesocricetus auratus

The domestication of the Syrian hamster began in the late 1900s when naturalists cataloged the Syrian hamster, also known as Mesocricetus auratus or the golden hamster. In 1930 medical researchers captured Syrian hamster breeding stock for animal testing. Further domestication led this animal to become a popular pet.

The Syrian hamster's natural habitat is in a small region of Northwest Syria near the city of Aleppo. It was first described by science in the 1797 second edition of The Natural History of Aleppo, a book written and edited by two Scottish physicians living in Syria. The Syrian hamster was first recognized as a distinct species in 1839. In 1930 Saul Adler, a scientist seeking animal subjects for medical research, had the first Syrian hamsters captured to become laboratory animals. Scientists bred those hamsters and during the 1930s sent their descendants to various other laboratories around the world. By the late 1940s in the United States, a commercial hamster industry had begun to provide hamsters for laboratory use and at the same time to popularize hamsters as pets. In later years, further expeditions back to Syria captured other hamsters to increase genetic diversity among the populations of hamsters shared among breeders.

Wild Syrian hamsters become tame in a matter of days after being captured and handled by humans. Wild hamsters are quick to adapt to captivity and thrive in a laboratory setting.

== Cataloging as a species ==
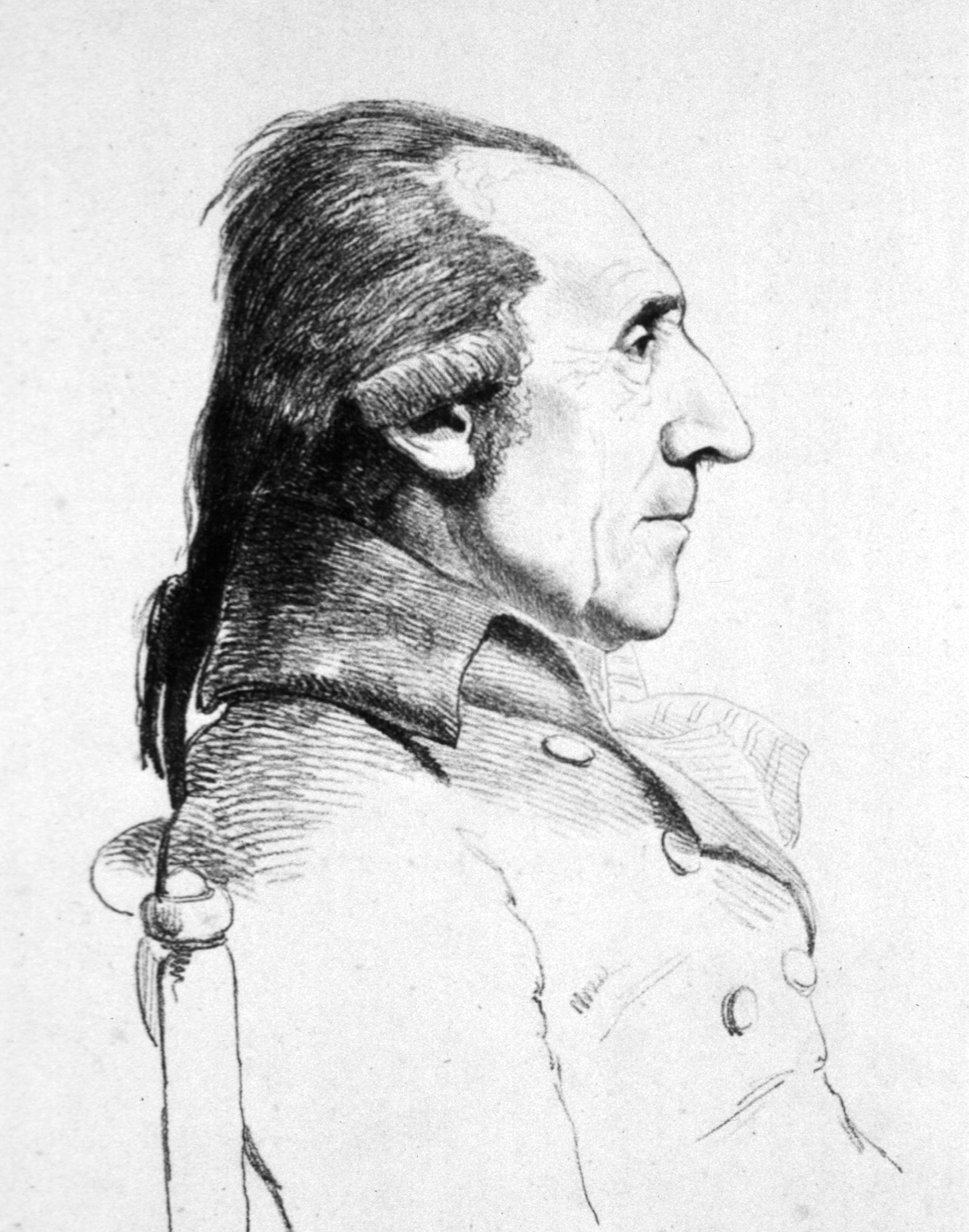
Patrick Russell, who provided the first written description of the hamster in the 1797 edition of The Natural History of Aleppo

The earliest known publication describing the Syrian hamster was in Patrick Russell's 1797 revision and second edition of his half-brother Alexander Russell's 1756 The Natural History of Aleppo. Alexander Russell was a Scottish physician who had been living in Syria from 1740 till 1750 or 55, and while in Aleppo, he documented the natural history of the region. Patrick Russell moved to Aleppo in 1750 and stayed there till 1781, and like his brother documented natural history. It is uncertain which brother wrote the description of the hamster for the book. Perhaps Patrick took it from Alexander's unpublished notes or perhaps it was Patrick's own addition to the book in the second edition.

The Hamster is less common than the field mouse. I once found upon dissecting one of them, the pouch on each side stuffed with young french beans, arranged lengthways so exactly, and close to each other, that it appeared strange by what mechanism it had been effected; for the membrane which forms the pouch, though muscular, is thin, and the most expert fingers could not have packed the beans in a more regular order. When they were laid loosely on the table, they formed a heap 3 times the bulk of the animal's body.

— Alexander and Patrick Russell, The Natural History of Aleppo, page 181 of the 1797 English second edition

In the Russell's book, the Syrian hamster is referenced as "Mus Cricetus Linn. S.N. p 82: Hamster, Buffon (H.N. XIII. p177)", which means that the Russells incorrectly cataloged the Syrian hamster to be the same species as the European hamster as described by the Comte de Buffon and Carl Linnaeus.

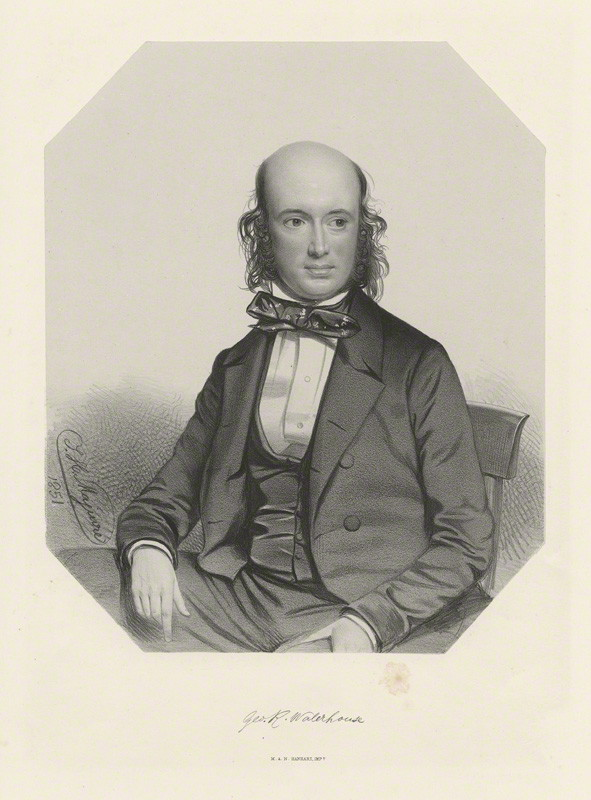
George Robert Waterhouse, who in 1839 first described the Syrian hamster as its own species

This species is less than the common Hamster (Cricetus vulgaris), and is remarkable for its deep golden yellow colouring. The fur is moderately long and very soft, and has a silk-like gloss; the deep golden yellow colouring extends over the upper parts and sides of the head and body, and also over the outer side of the limbs: on the back the hairs are brownish at the tip, hence in this part the fur assumes a deeper hue than on the sides of the body: the sides of the muzzle, throat, and upper parts of the body are white, but faintly tinted with yellow: on the back, and sides of the body, all the hairs are of a deep grey or lead colour at the base. The feet and tail are white. The ears are of moderate size, furnished externally with deep golden-coloured hairs, and internally with whitish hairs. The moustaches consist of black and white hairs intermixed.

— Waterhouse, G.R. (9 April 1839). "Proceedings of learned societies, Zoological Society". Annals and Magazine of Natural History. 1840 (4): 445–446.

In 1839 at a meeting of the London Zoological Society George Robert Waterhouse described the Syrian hamster as a new species. His identification of the animal happened after his 1835 appointment as a curator of the museum of the London Zoological Society, where his job was to process mammal specimens. The body in the museum became the type specimen for the new species. There is no record of who collected the specimen nor is there any record of who donated the body to that museum. In 1853 the British Museum purchased the collections of the London Zoological Society, so now, this original hamster is in the British Museum as specimen BM(NH) 1855.12.24.120. Some derivative works of the Waterhouse publication which also presented the existence of the hamster were Louis Fraser's 1849 Zoologia Typica, Christoph Gottfried Andreas Giebel's 1855 Säugetiere, and Henry Baker Tristram's 1884 Fauna and Flora of Palestine.

In 1902 Alfred Nehring studied a preserved female Syrian hamster specimen at the Beirut Museum. In 1898 he defined and established the genus Mesocricetus and redefined the Syrian hamster as Mesocricetus auratus. Publication in 1940 confirmed that Mesocricetus was a well-characterized genus different from Cricetus.

== Capture of live hamsters ==
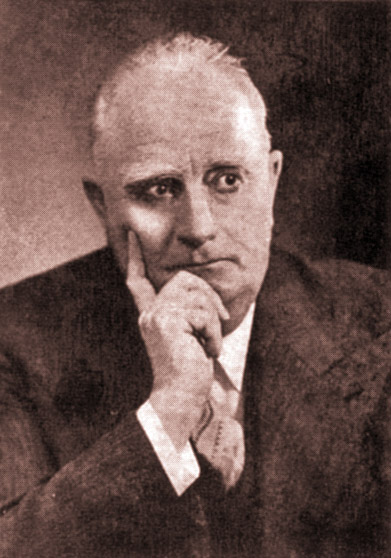
Israel Aharoni, who directed the capture of the first Syrian hamsters to be bred in captivity

After Waterhouse identified the hamster there seems to be no original scientific study of the Syrian hamster until 1930. In 1930, Israel Aharoni captured the first live hamsters known to science and in 1942 published his notes and a narrative of the experience in an autobiography, Memoirs of a Hebrew Zoologist (זכרונות זואולוג עברי [Transliterated: Zichronot Zoolog Ivri]).

Sometime before Aharoni's 1930 hamster expedition, parasitologist Saul Adler was having trouble doing his research because of lack of animal testing subjects. Leishmaniasis was a regional problem and it was common to infect Chinese hamsters as a model organism to study the disease. However, he was having problem breeding those hamsters in captivity, and had difficulty also getting regular shipments of Chinese hamsters from China. Because of these problems, he wished to find a Middle Eastern hamster that would be easy to capture locally and have potential in animal testing. Adler may or may not have known of the existence of the Syrian hamster from the Waterhouse publication or others copying information from that work. Whatever he knew, he contacted Israel Aharoni for advice, as both were researchers at Hebrew University of Jerusalem and Aharoni was the head of the zoology department.

Aharoni already knew of the Syrian hamster and when he made his plan to respond to Adler's request, he planned to capture Syrian hamsters and provide them to Adler. Aharoni took assistance from a local Syrian guide, Georgius Khalil Tah'an, who on his behalf got information from a local leader Sheik El-Beled about where hamsters might be found. On 12 April 1930, the sheik called Aharoni and Georgius to a meeting which led to the capture of hamsters and which Aharoni described as follows:

At the meeting, it was decided to hunt out this creature in one of the best fields, a field that the hamster had chosen to colonize. The sheik hired a few laborers and they dug in many places, destroying a good part of the wheat field. After several hours of hard work, they succeeded in raising from a depth of 8 feet, a complete nest, nicely upholstered, with a mother and her 11 young! Thinking that the mother would care for her infants and feed them, Georgeus put the whole family into a colony box. But his hopes were not fulfilled... I saw the mother hamster (a creature whose evolutionary level is not high) harden her heart and sever with ugly cruelty the head of the pup that approached her most closely (each of the young measured at the time just 2 1/2 cm). Natural mother-love led her to kill her dear child: "It is better that my infant die than that it be the object of an experiment performed on it by a member of the accursed human race." When Georgeus saw this act of savagery, he quickly removed the murdering mother hamster (for she would surely kill them all!) and put her in a bottle of cyanide to kill her.

— Aharoni, Memoirs of a Hebrew Zoologist, 1942

After starting with a mother and 11 babies, Aharoni was left with 10. At the time of capture the babies' eyes were not yet opened due to their age. Aharoni and his wife cared for the hamsters as they carried them back to the university. Somehow before returning the hamsters to the university, all of the hamsters escaped, and when Aharoni recovered them, one had escaped permanently leaving 9 babies. Aharoni delivered these to Heim Ben-Menachen, who was the head of the Hebrew University animal facilities and that department's founder. Ben-Menachen put the hamsters in a wooden box on the floor, and Aharoni recorded this account of what happened next:

When he found out about the great catastrophe (the escape of five of the hamsters who chewed their way through the bottom of the cage and got out), he was aghast. Anyone who did not see the shock on that man's face has never seen a man smitten, shaken to the depths... I pitied him. His dismay increased as I described how difficult it was to get the creatures out of the depths of the earth, the great value of the discovery of this beautiful animal, that in the whole wide world, the only suitable habitat it could find was a long region between Aleppo and Homs; of all the bundles of dried grass, all the hay, all the sheves of wheat...

— Aharoni, Memoirs of a Hebrew Zoologist, 1942

The most thorough search was unable to find the escaped hamsters, leaving three females and a male. The male hamster then killed one of the females. Aharoni doubted that the remaining hamsters would breed. Ben-Menachen tried a new breeding technique, described as follows:

...(Ben-Menachen) filled a large wire-mesh cage with tightly packed hay, leaving only a 5 cm, brightly illuminated space on top. In this space he placed his female. Seeking darkness, the female began to burrow into the hay. A day or two later the male was placed in the cage. It proceeded to chase the female – who was far more familiar with the environment than her assigned mate – and finally (how long it was I don't know) caught up with her. By then both were tired and the male was presumably quite aroused. I assume that their position in the burrow was more favorable to mating than to slaughter, and they mated.

— son of Ben-Menachen, letter to Murphy, as quoted in Murphy 1985, p. 12

Aharoni wrote this conclusion:

Out of love for science and for the broadening of mankind, the Allpowerful nudged a single wheel of the uncountable wheels of nature – and a miracle happened!

Only someone who has tasted true happiness, heavenly joy, can appreciate our elation over the fact that our great effort did not prove to be in vain. Our goal was achieved. From now on there will be a species of hamster that will be fruitful and multiple even in captivity, and will be convenient for endless laboratory experimentation.

The supervisor of the animal colony devoted himself to raising the infants with love and admirable selflessness. Instead of the water she had received as a pup, the mother fed the infants milk, known since ancient times to be more beneficial than water. The sons sired and the daughters gave birth to "countless" new sons and daughters. And with the aid of God (not just by luck) the hamster that was brought from Aleppo proved to be incredibly prolific, and all from one mother!

How marvelous are thy works, O Lord!

— Aharoni, Memoirs of a Hebrew Zoologist, 1942

Within one year, these three hamster siblings were the origin of a colony of 150 hamsters. Adler was the first recipient of hamsters from this colony. Adler and another scientist published the first research using Syrian hamsters in 1931. Adler was known for his generosity and modesty and often did not make a record of his work, so some of what happened next is uncertain. Aharoni made no mention of further hamster expeditions in his memoir, but the Museum für Naturkunde has three female hamster specimens in their collection attributed to him and noted as having been caught 27 and 29 April 1930.

== Establishment in laboratories ==
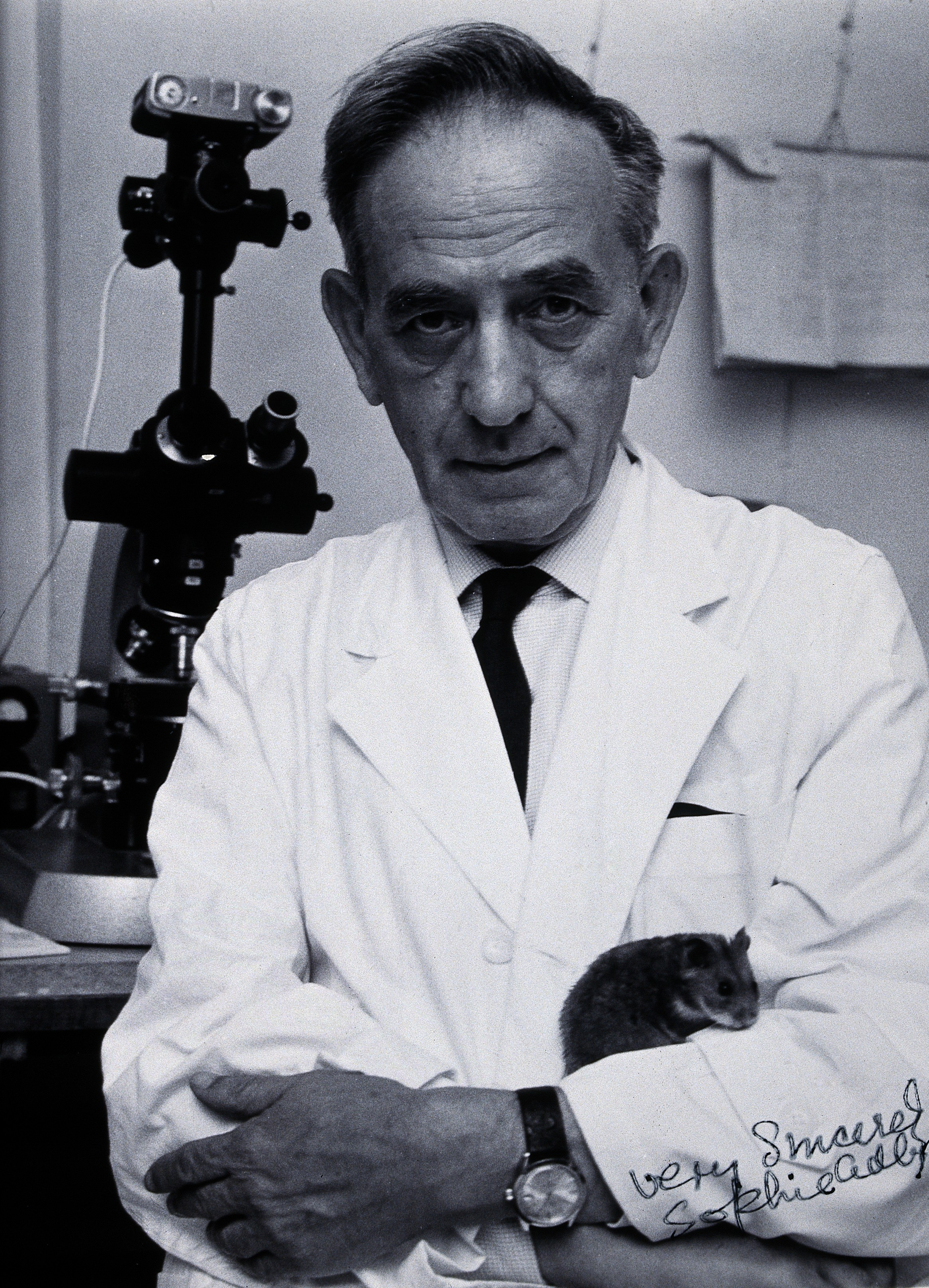
Medical researcher Saul Adler shared Syrian hamsters with other medical researchers, establishing the animal internationally.

=== Israel ===
Among his many scientific projects and recognition, Saul Adler took particular pleasure in distributing Syrian hamsters to researchers in other laboratories. His motivation was the usefulness of the hamster and because he recognized the fragile nature of the single colony.

=== United Kingdom ===
In 1931 Adler did wildlife smuggling of hamsters through customs into England by hiding them in his coat pockets. He gave the hamsters to Edward Hindle, then of the London Zoological Society, who himself established a colony for researchers. The hamsters eventually came to the laboratory of Leonard Goodwin whose hamsters became the stock of pet hamsters in the UK.

=== United States ===
There is agreement that Syrian hamsters must have come to the United States in 1938. Beyond that, it is unclear how many colonies of hamsters came, why they were sent, or where they went. The available evidence identifies three colonies of hamsters arriving in that year, with two colonies said to have come from Saul Adler, and another colony which could have come from him or otherwise which came from Israel Jacob Kligler, who himself got his hamsters from Adler. In 1939 scientists at Case Western Reserve University published a paper on inoculating Syrian hamsters with leprosy, and in that paper, they said, "Our original colony of 13 animals was secured from stock at the Hebrew University on July 26, 1938 through the kindness of Dr. Adler." There are records that Guy Henry Faget of the United States Public Health Service in Carville, Louisiana, received a shipment of Syrian hamsters from Adler in 1938. Faget's laboratory has notes that they received 12 hamsters in July 1938, and another record says that both Adler sent both Faget and Case Western similar shipments of hamsters at the same time. A 1950 publication says that two shipments of hamsters arrived to America in 1938, one to Case Western and the other to Rockefeller Foundation. In 1940 and 41 the Rockefeller Foundation and one of its partner laboratories in Berkeley published several papers based on Syrian hamsters as test subjects, so definitely they had hamsters at that time. In 1948 Adler wrote that before World War II he sent hamsters to India and that Kligler sent animals to America. Since in other notes Adler is known to have sent two colonies to America but not more than that, the available information suggests that the hamsters to Rockefeller came from Kligler and the others were the shipment from Adler.

Hamsters in the United States may have all proliferated from these three colonies.

== Popularization as pets ==
=== United Kingdom ===
In 1880 as British Consul to Syria James Henry Skene was retiring back to Edinburgh, he returned from Syria with Syrian hamsters. He died in 1886. The colony of hamsters remained alive until 1910.

When Adler's hamsters passed through the laboratory of Leonard Goodwin, those hamsters became the stock of pet hamsters in the UK. From the UK these hamsters also spread throughout Europe.

=== United States ===
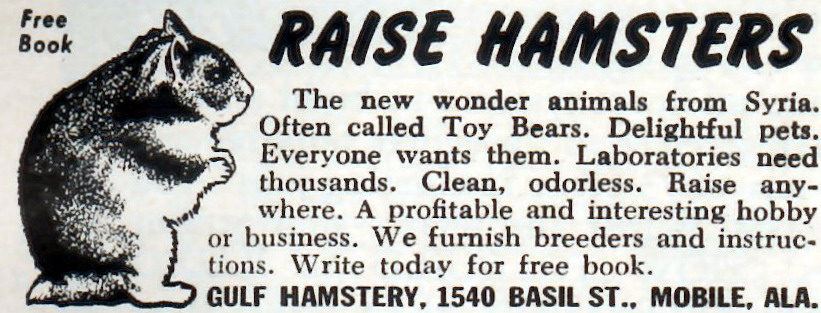
This advertisement from Gulf Hamstery appeared in numerous popular science magazines around 1948–1951.

Albert Marsh of Mobile, Alabama, established the commercial hamster industry in the United States in the 1940s. Marsh first got a hamster when he was gambling and won it in a wager for $1. Somehow he got more hamsters after this one, perhaps from the breeding stock managed by Guy Henry Faget in Carville, Louisiana. At the time, Marsh was a highway engineer but unemployed. After getting his hamsters, he learned to breed them and founded Marsh Enterprises and the Gulf Hamstery, which promoted Syrian hamsters as pets, for laboratory use, and in business schemes. Marsh took advertisements in magazines, comics, and livestock trade journals which praised hamsters as pets and presented the idea that breeding hamsters was a good business investment. In his business, he shipped hamsters to people who would be breeders, then he coordinated the shipment of various breeders' hamsters to other breeders or to laboratories.

Marsh was successful in part because of the professionalism he brought to the art of hamster husbandry. He authored a book, The Hamster Manual, which had a distribution of 80,000 copies by its 6th edition in 1951. In 1946, Marsh began a campaign to legalize the ownership of hamsters in California, which were prohibited. On 10 February 1948, with the help of the governor of Alabama and others, Marsh was successful in convincing the California State Department of Agriculture to designate Syrian hamsters as "normally domesticated animals".

The hamstery business peaked from 1948 to 1951 then profitability dropped to almost nothing in the early 1950s. The market changed when small hamsteries, most of which started with hamsters from Marsh, became available everywhere and satisfied local demand for pet hamsters. Marsh's Gulf Hamstery closed in the 1950s.
