= Bab al-Jinan =

Coordinates: 36°12′7″N 37°9′7″E

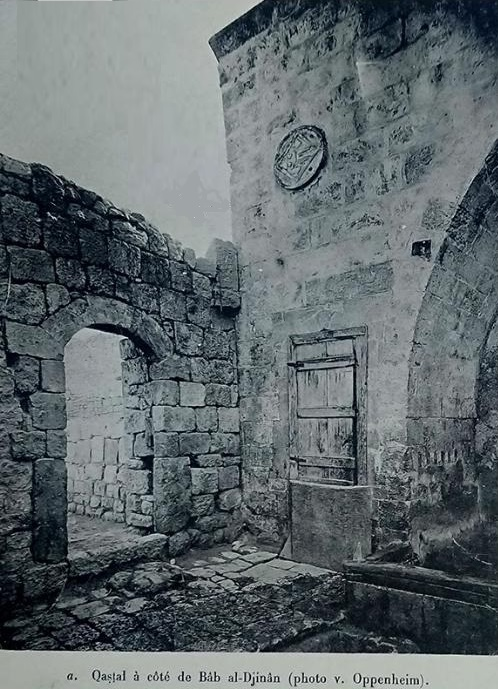
Bab al-Jinan, photo taken by Baron Max von Oppenheim, circa 1899

Bab al-Jinan (Arabic: بَاب الْجِنَان, romanized: Bāb al-Jinān), meaning the Gate of Gardens, was one of the gates of Aleppo that used to lead to gardens on the banks of the Quwēq river.

The gate is thought to have been built by Sayf al-Dawla during his possession of Aleppo between 944 and 967. The gate provided access to the great palace of Halba and gardens that Sayf al-Dawla had built outside the city. The gate was referred to by Al-Muqaddasi in 985 as The Watermelon Gate, and noted by Alexander Russell in his 1756 book The Natural History of Aleppo.

The gate was demolished around 1900 in order to widen the road. There used to be numerous exchangers and storage houses for goods near the gate, and a pine dating back to the 16th century. The gate had a tower called the "serpent tower" in which was said to be a talisman capable of protecting from serpent bites. Bāb Jnēn today is the site of a traditional souk.

== Bibliography ==
- Bianquis, Thierry (1998). "Autonomous Egypt from Ibn Ṭūlūn to Kāfūr, 868–969". In Petry, Carl F. (ed.). Cambridge History of Egypt, Volume One: Islamic Egypt, 640–1517. Cambridge: Cambridge University Press. pp. 86–119. ISBN 0-521-47137-0.
- Humphreys, Stephen (2010). "Syria". In Robinson, Charles F. (ed.). The New Cambridge History of Islam, Volume I: The Formation of the Islamic World, Sixth to Eleventh Centuries. Cambridge and New York: Cambridge University Press. pp. 506–540. ISBN 978-0-521-83823-8.
