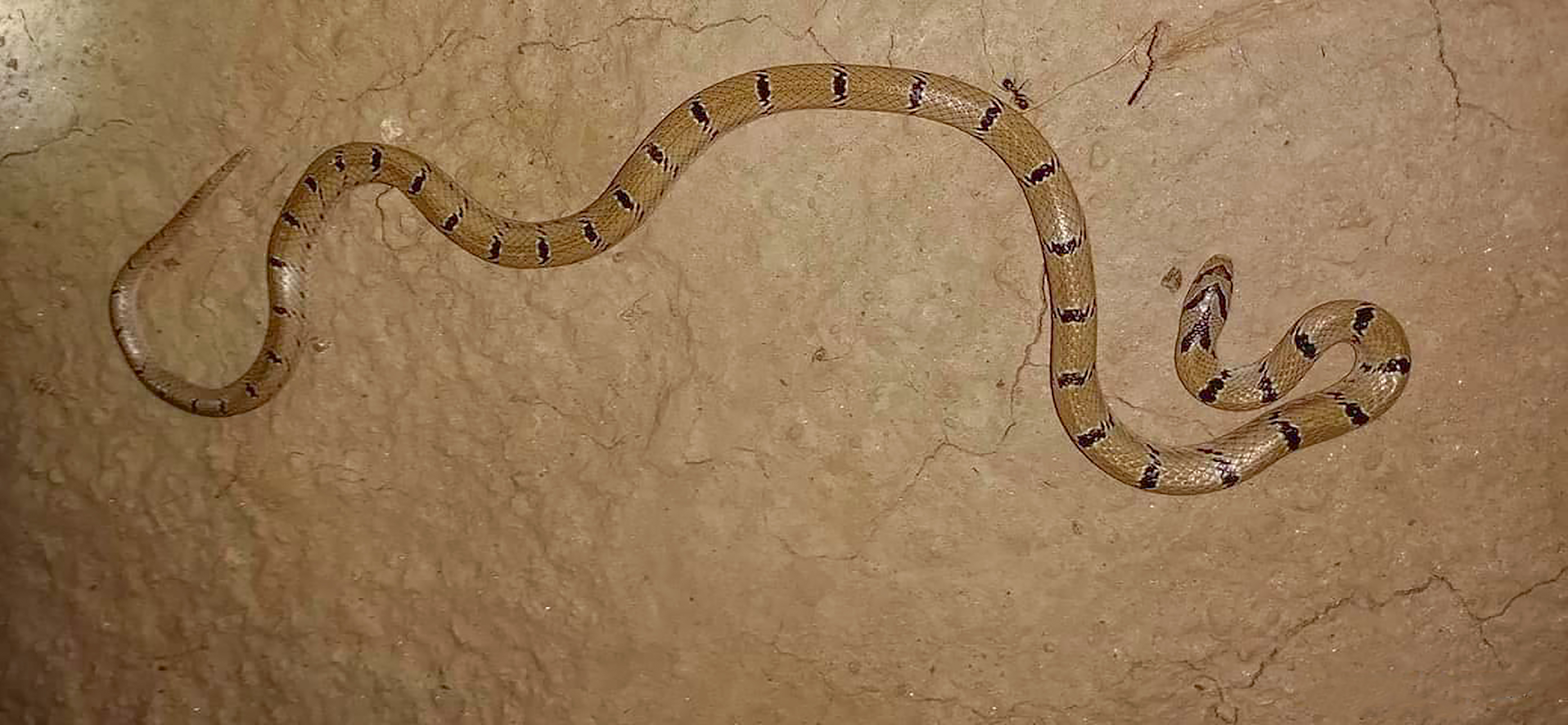
- Russell's kukri from West Bengal.

Scientific classification
- Kingdom: Animalia
- Phylum: Chordata
- Class: Reptilia
- Order: Squamata
- Suborder: Serpentes
- Family: Colubridae
- Genus: Oligodon
- Species: O. russelius

Binomial name
- Oligodon russelius (Daudin, 1803)

Synonyms
- Coluber russelius Daudin, 1803; Coronella russelii (Daudin, 1803); Simotes russelii (Daudin, 1803); Oligodon churahensis Mirza, Bhardwaj & H. Patel, 2021

= Oligodon russelius =

Species of snake

Oligodon russelius, commonly known as Russell's kukri snake, is a species of snake in the family Colubridae. The species, which is native to South Asia, is very closely related to Oligodon arnensis, from which it has been recently separated. The specific epithet, russelius, honours British herpetologist Patrick Russell, one of whose illustrations possibly depicts this species.

== Taxonomy ==
Oligodon russelius was recognised as a distinct species in 2022 after a morphological and biogeographical evaluation of the Oligodon arnensis species complex. The populations of Oligodon arnensis (sensu lato) in the northern regions of India have now been assigned as Oligodon russelius (sensu stricto), distinguished from the southern population, which remains Oligodon arnensis.

== Ecology ==
=== Distribution ===
Oligodon russelius is found in Nepal, Northern India, North-East Pakistan, and possibly parts of Bangladesh.

=== Diet ===
Its diet includes small lizards and eggs.

=== Reproduction ===
The snake is oviparous, like many other colubrids. A clutch contains four or five remarkably elongate eggs with measured dimensions of 36x3x10 mm. The snout-to-vent length of the hatchlings are around 181–193 mm (7.1–7.6 in). The hatchlings are usually brighter in color, with faded and less prominent cross stripes, but with distinct white margins. The juveniles have been mostly observed in April to July and during the winter.

== Conservation ==
The species Oligodon russelius is of common occurrence and has a widespread range. The risk of extinction is regarded as low. The snake often gets killed by humans, particularly because of misidentification as a krait, due to the presence of bands. It is also often reported as road kill.

== Gallery ==
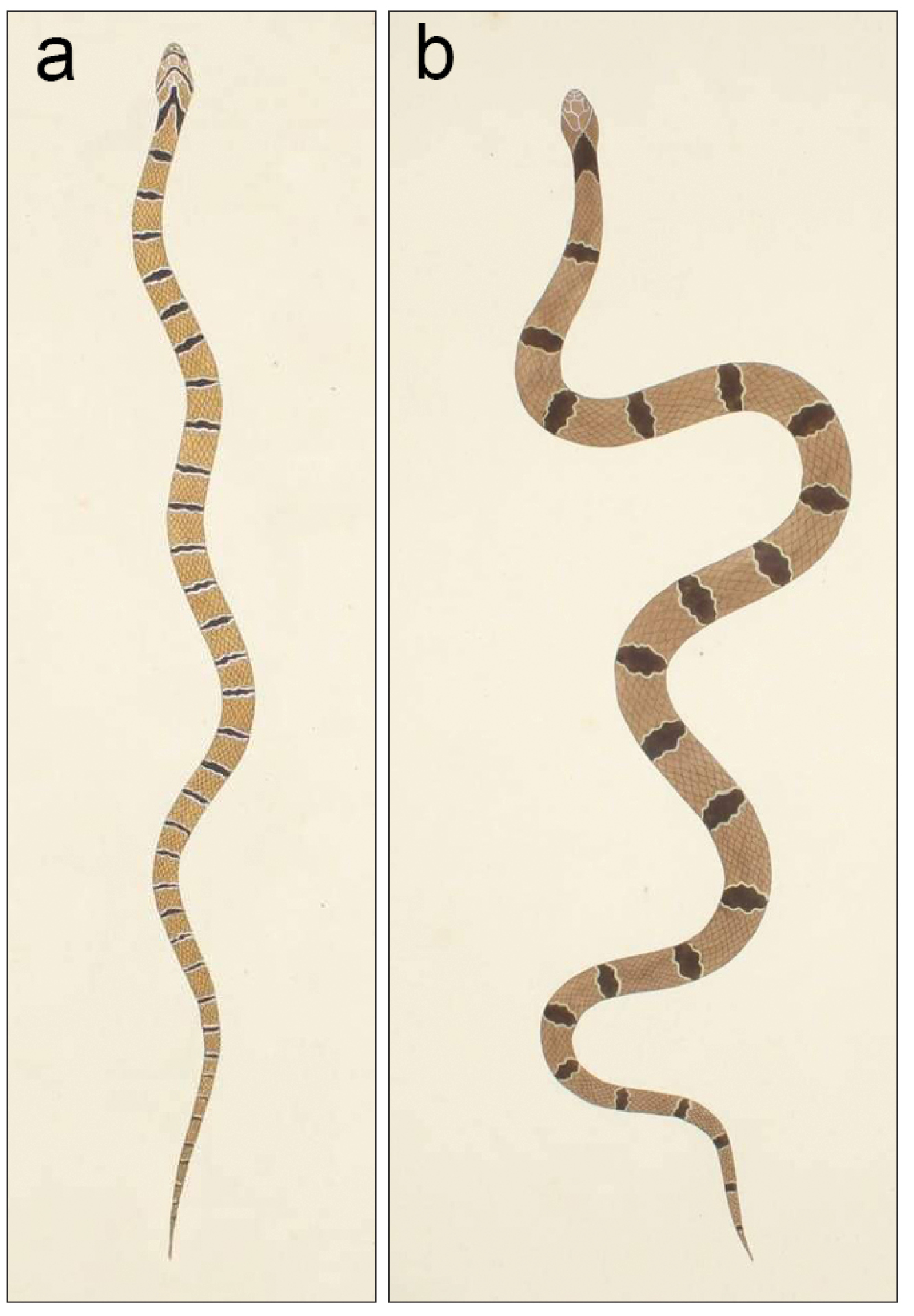
Patrick Russell's original depiction of "Coluber russelius" (Fig. a)

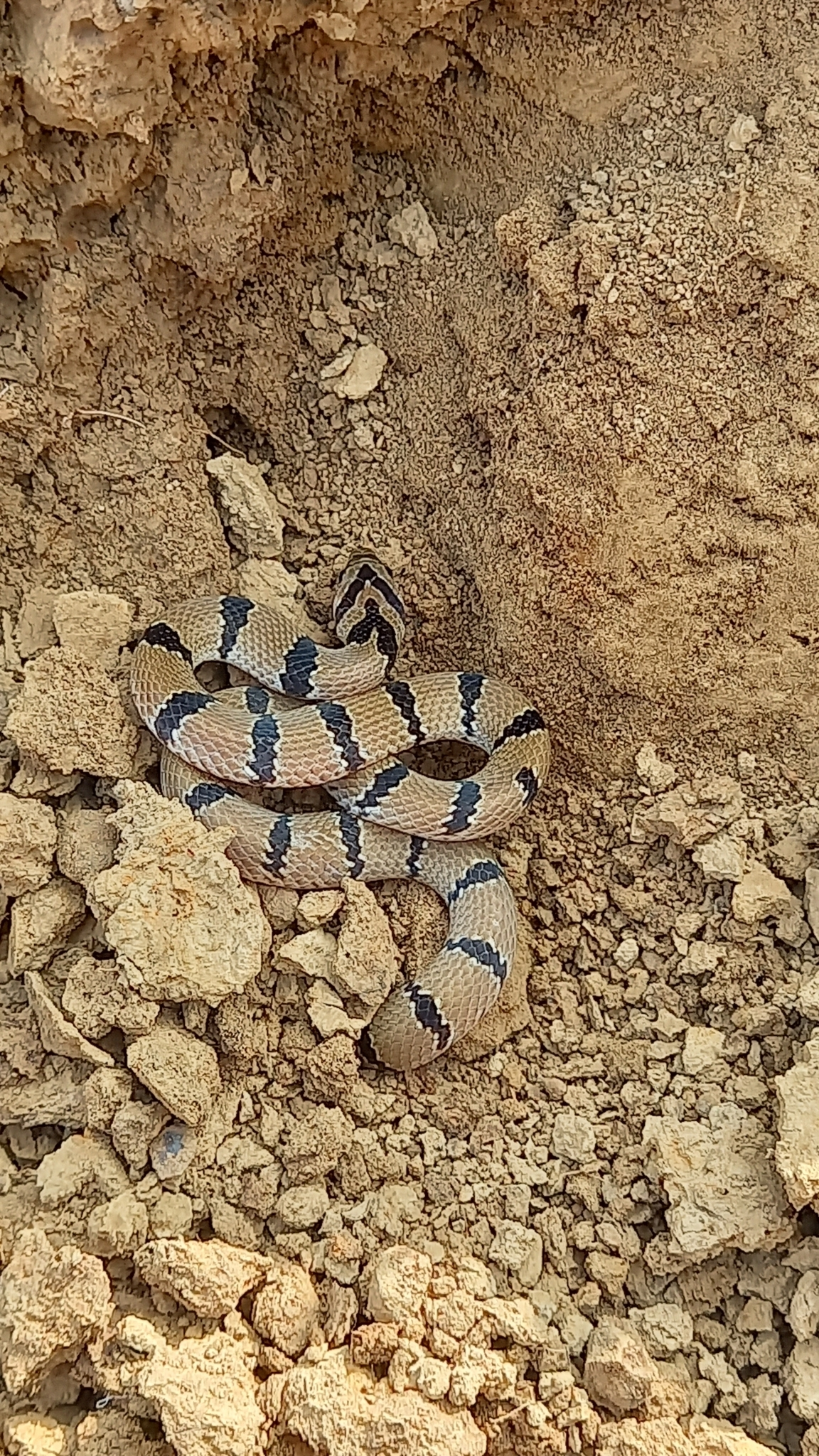

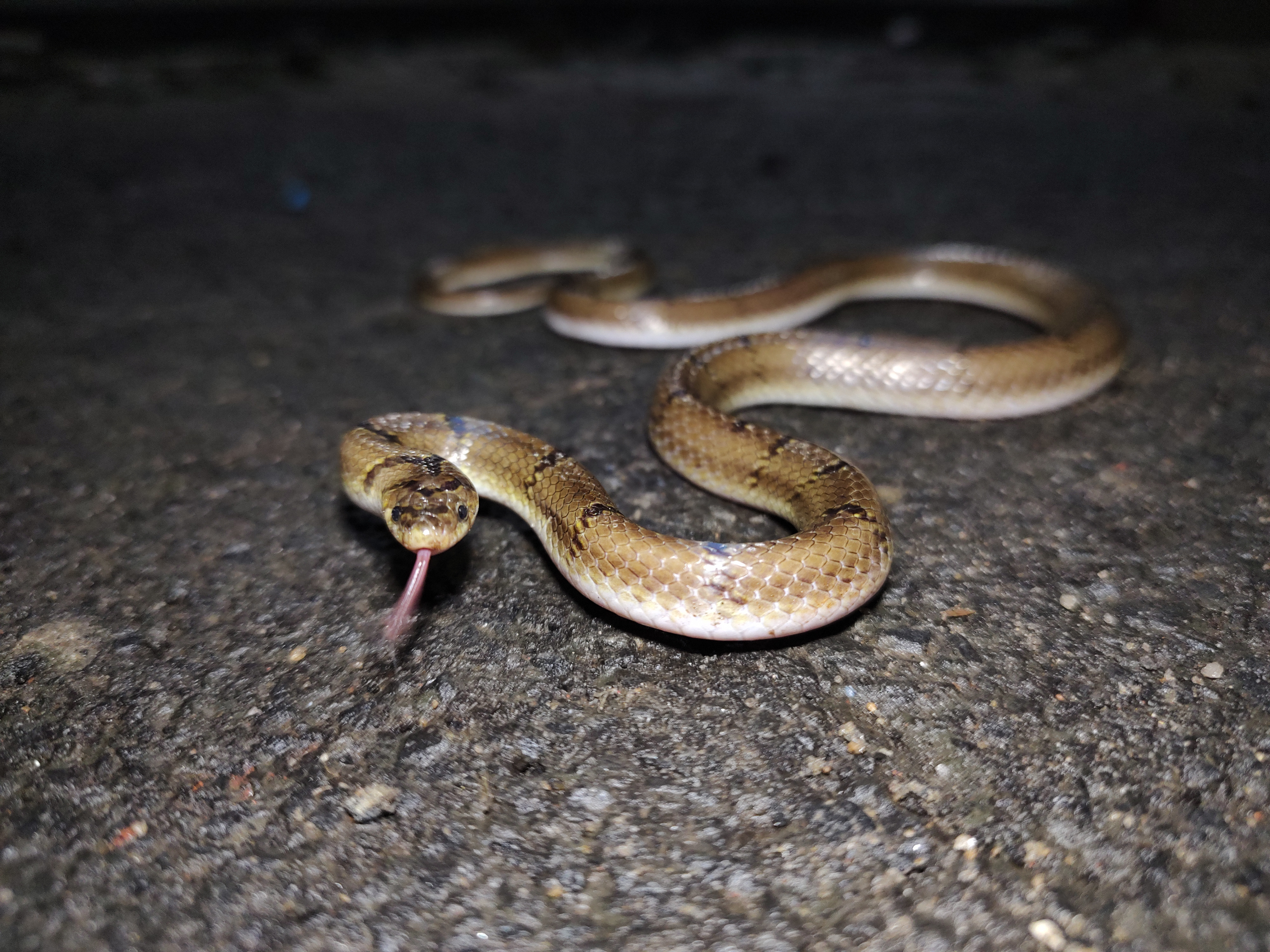
Front view

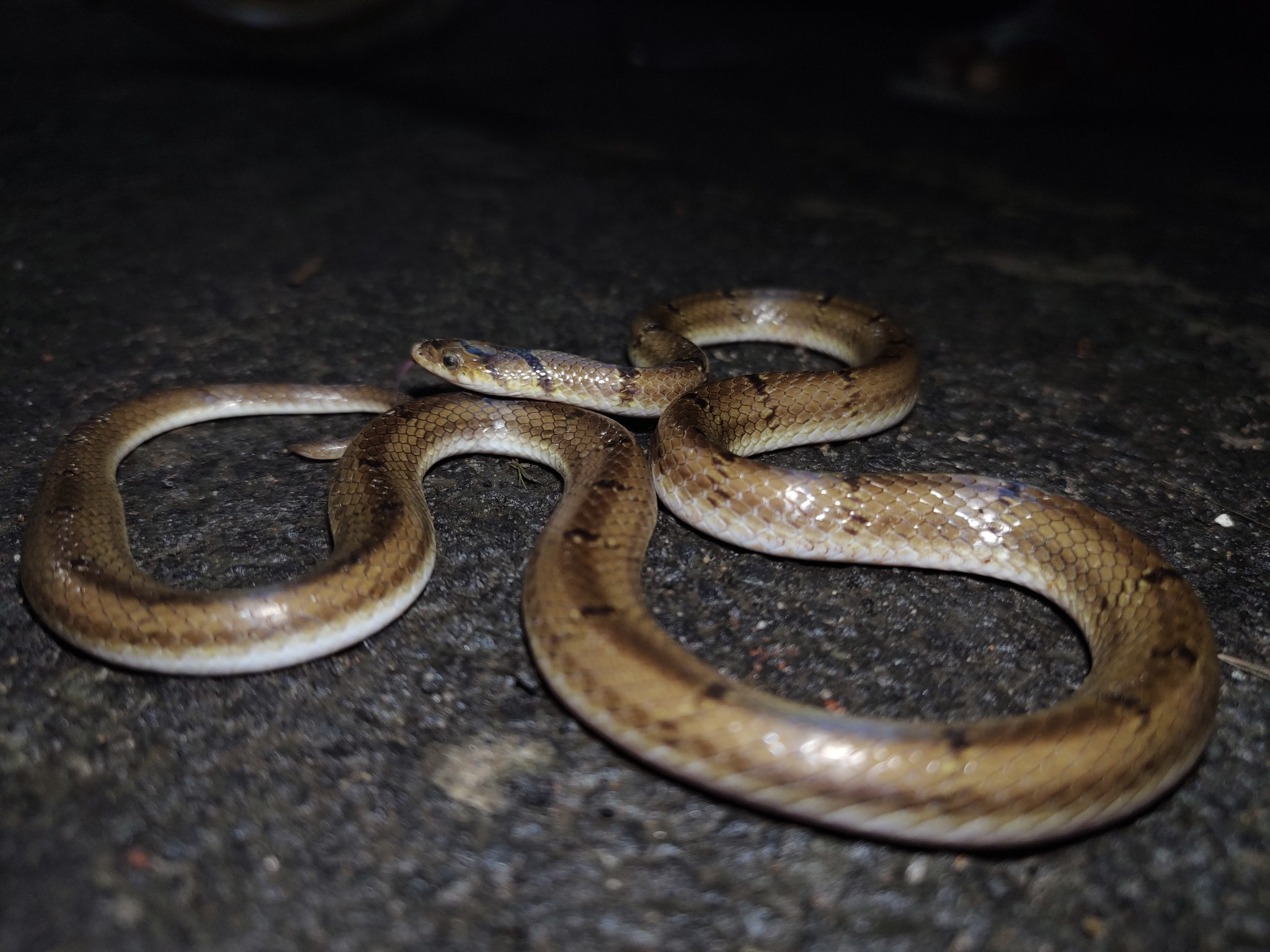
Side view
