= Leishmaniasis vaccine =

Vaccine against leishmaniasis

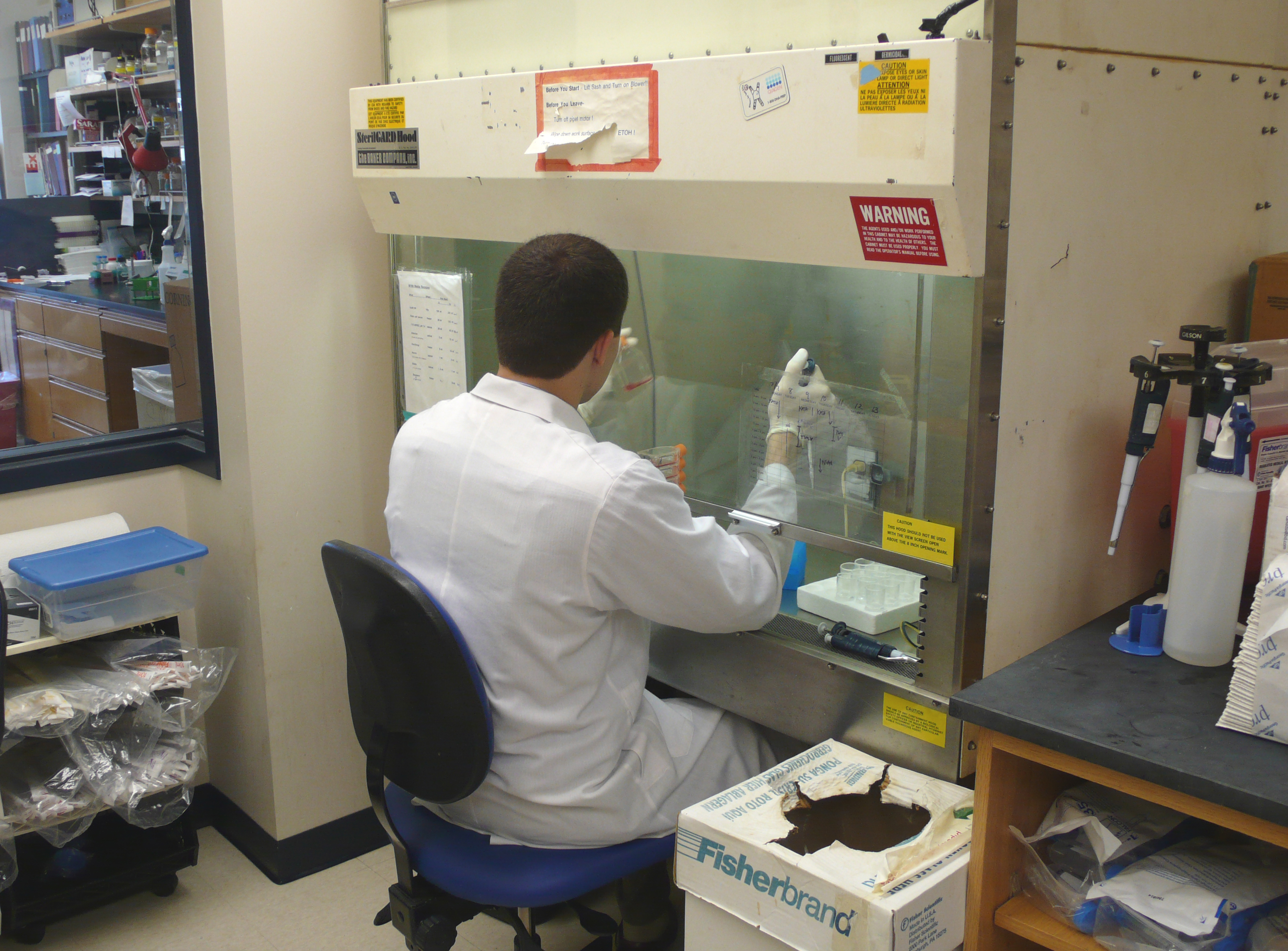
A parasitologist working on L. major in a biocontainment hood

A Leishmaniasis vaccine is a vaccine which would prevent leishmaniasis. As of 2024, no vaccine for humans was available. Currently some effective leishmaniasis vaccines for dogs exist.

The parasite which causes leishmaniasis is Leishmania, which is a Trypanosomatida. The disease spreads to humans from sandflies, which act as vectors for the parasite when they bite. Animals (such as dogs and rodents) can be a reservoir for the parasite, spreading it to sandflies, and from sandflies to humans.

Scientists wish for a vaccine and there is vaccine research. There is also consideration that public health practices can control or eliminate leishmaniasis without a vaccine. A vaccination strategy to control or eliminate leishmaniasis might include developing a vaccine for humans and other vaccines for animals.

== Leishmanization ==
People who recover from leishmaniasis gain immunity from reinfection. "Leishmanization" is the practice of inoculation with live Leishmania to induce mild cutaneous leishmaniasis (CL) to prevent future dangerous infection. Some Bedouin and Kurdish cultures practiced leishmanization as traditional medicine. There are historic accounts and decades of medical research describing the efficacy of this.

Traditional knowledge about leishmanization has informed the development of a leishmaniasis vaccine.

== Vaccine development ==
A 2015 paper claimed that the development and use of a vaccine would be the best way to eliminate leishmaniasis from South Asia. Attempts to create a vaccine with live, inactivated or attenuated Leishmania have failed. Attempts to create a peptide, DNA, or protein vaccine have shown efficacy in animal vaccine models but not effective in humans. There are a series of challenges with explanations in molecular biology which explain the difficulty of vaccine development.

Vaccine development is difficult because the parasites live in humans, sandflies, and other animals, so a vaccine in humans alone would not eliminate the protozoan in insects and animals. There is a challenge in interpreting the data in animal models to apply to humans. Another challenge is effectively transferring knowledge from laboratory settings to field practice. There is also a basic lack of scientific understanding of how an antiparasitic vaccine should generate and maintain immunological memory during parasitic infection.

The development of a vaccine using CRISPR-Cas9 technology was published in 2020 which showed that inoculation with a live attenuated Leishmania major strain induces durable protection, analogous to leishmanization. Another gene deletion mutant was created in a Leishmania mexicana strain in 2022, showing complete inhibition of the typical cutaneous lesions in mouse models thanks to a diminished induction of the Th2 cytokines.

== Clinical trials ==
As of 2016 there are several vaccines in development and three have gone to clinical trials. One clinical trial in Brazil used an inactivated vaccine for human immunotherapy. Another in Uzbekistan used an attenuated vaccine for human immunotherapy. Another in Brazil was vaccination of dogs to prevent those animals from spreading the disease.

The dog vaccines are successful in providing immunity. In 2008, a vaccine for dogs was launched in Brazil, which is known as LeishTech, a recombinant protein based vaccine. In 2011 CaniLeish, a vaccine made with antigens from L. infantum, was licensed in Europe. Efforts are on ongoing to develop further vaccines for dogs with one second generation vaccine up for approval in Brazil as of 2017.

== History ==
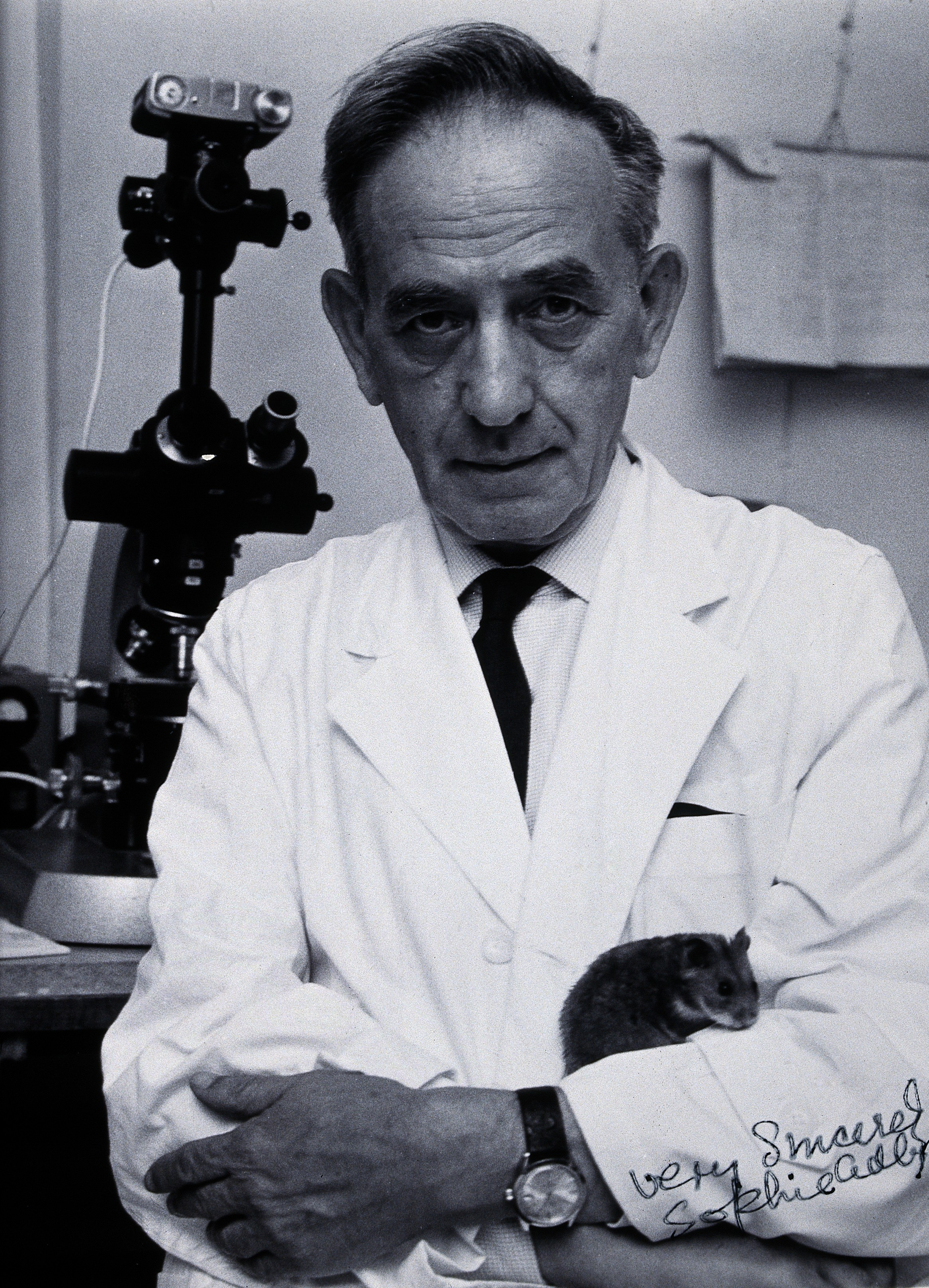
Saul Adler domesticated the Syrian hamster in the 1930s to use in Leishmaniasis research.

In the early 1900s scientists learned how to culture the parasite, and work in the 1940s led by Saul Adler led to the practice of leishmanization being widespread in Israel and Russia until the 1980s, when large-scale clinical trials showed that the practice led to long-term skin lesions, exacerbation of psoriasis, and immunosuppression in some people. During the Iran–Iraq War over 2 million people in Iran were vaccinated this way. As of 2006 such vaccines were still licensed and used in Uzbekistan.

Clinical trials with killed parasites had conflicting results in the 1940s, and work on such vaccines did not resume until the 1970s, when there were promising small clinical trials, and which continued with extensive clinical trials in Ecuador, Brazil, in Iran, through the 1990s.

Preclinical work with genetically modified live attenuated parasite vaccines was conducted in the 1990s and 2000s, as did work with synthetic peptides, recombinant proteins, glycoproteins and glycolipids from leishmania species, and naked DNA. As of 2016, none of these second-generation vaccine candidates had reached the market, and few had been tested in clinical trials.
