= Saul Adler =

Israeli microbiologist

Saul Adler FRS
- שאול אדלר
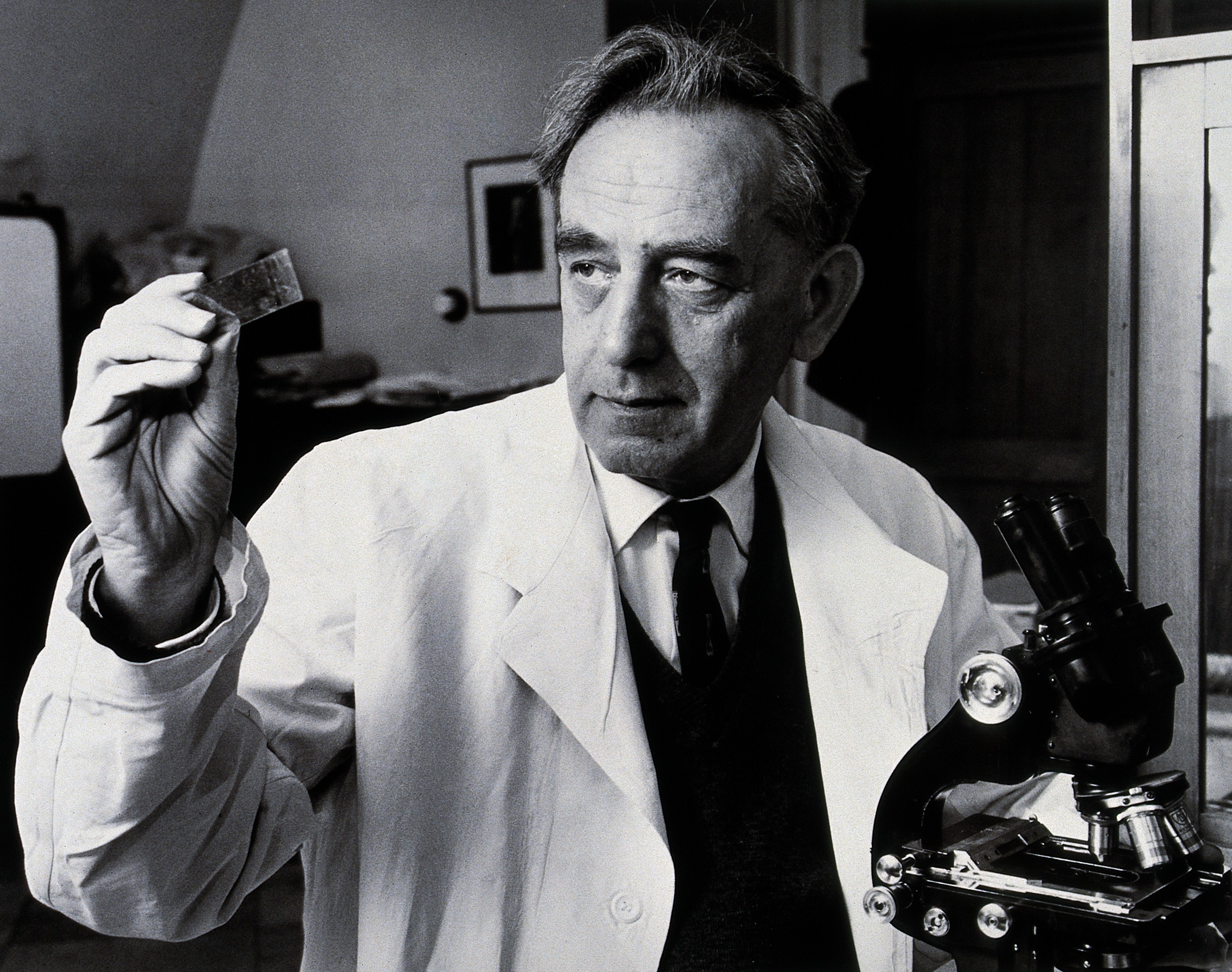
- Born: 17 May 1895
- Died: 25 January 1966 (aged 70)
- Education: Liverpool School of Tropical Medicine; University of Leeds
- Awards: Fellow of the Royal Society
- Scientific career
- Fields: Parasitology

Saul Adler OBE FRS (Hebrew: שאול אדלר; May 17, 1895 – January 25, 1966) was an Israeli expert on parasitology.

== Early life ==
Adler was born in 1895 in Kerelits (Karelichy), then in the Russian Empire, now in Belarus. In 1900, he and his family moved to England and they settled in Leeds. He studied at University of Leeds and the Liverpool School of Tropical Medicine.

One of his brothers was Solomon Adler, the economist.

== Career ==
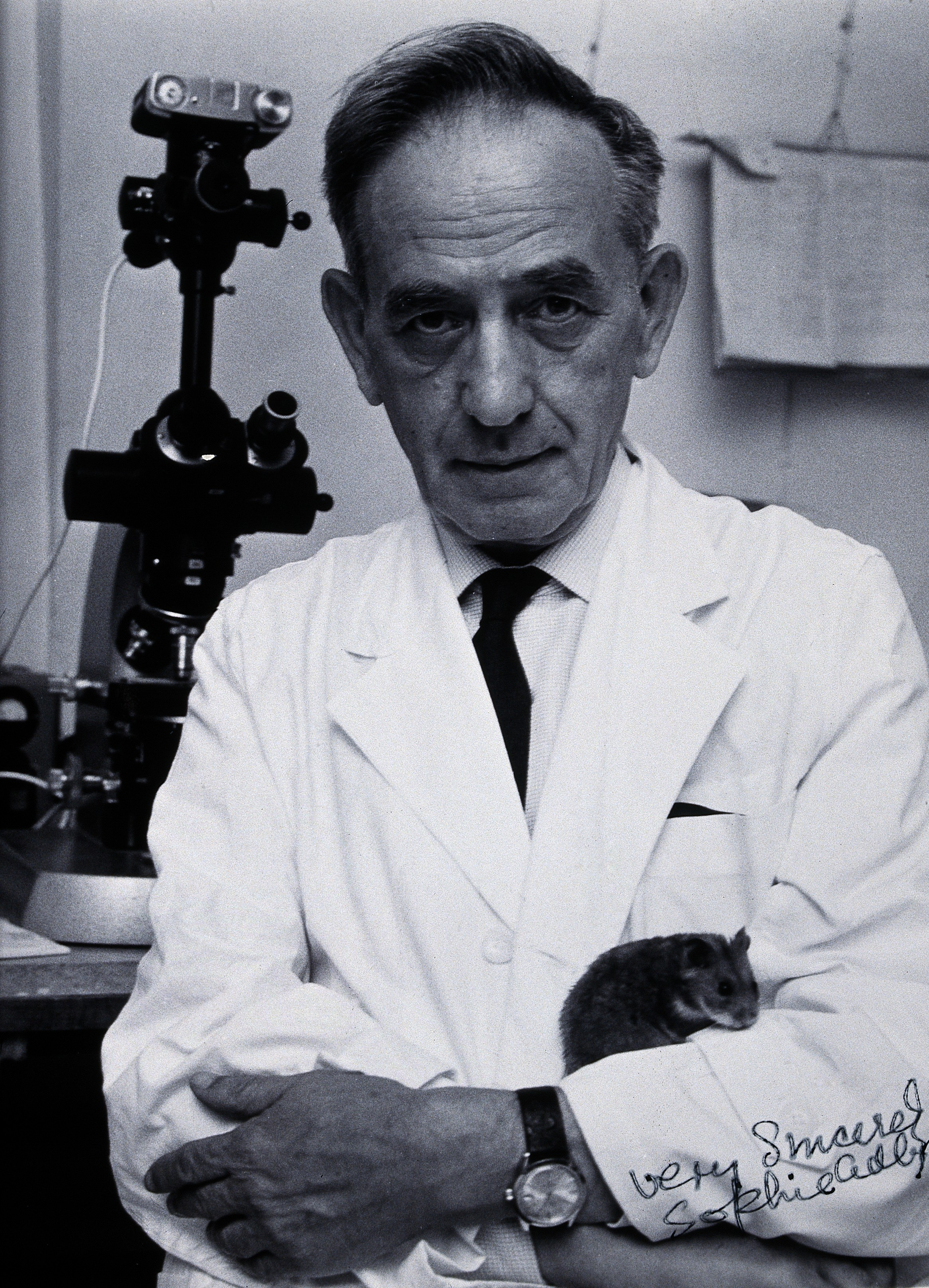
Saul Adler by Werner Braun, with a laboratory hamster

From 1917 until 1920, Adler served in the Royal Army Medical Corps, attaining the rank of captain, serving in the Middle East, where he developed his first taste into research into tropical medicine, which he commenced studying after his military service, initially in Liverpool. In 1921, Adler went to Sierra Leone to conduct research into Malaria.

In 1924, Chaim Weizmann offered him a job in Jerusalem to develop the new Institute of Microbiology. Later that year, he emigrated to Mandate Palestine and started working in Hadassah Hospital, becoming director of the department of parasitology in 1927. In 1924, he became Assistant Professor of the Department of Parasitology at the Hebrew University of Jerusalem, serving as Professor from 1928 to 1955.

In 1930, in conjunction with Israel Aharoni, Adler had three Syrian hamsters brought back from Syria and successfully bred them as laboratory animals. This led to the domestication of the Syrian hamster.

In the 1940s he was a leader in developing a leishmaniasis vaccine using live parasites, a practice widespread in Israel and Russia until the 1980s, when large-scale clinical trials showed that the practice led to long-term skin lesions, exacerbation of psoriasis, and immunosuppression in some people.

== Education ==
- University of Leeds, MB, ChB, Leeds, 1917;
- Liverpool School of Tropical Medicine, DTM, Liverpool, 1920;
- MRCP 1937;
- FRCP 1958.

== Honours ==
- In 1933, Chalmers Medal of the Royal Society of Tropical Medicine and Hygiene (London).
- In 1944, elected Chairman of Free Faculty of Medicine of the Hebrew University of Jerusalem.
- In 1947, received Order of the British Empire (OBE)
- In 1957, awarded the Israel Prize, for medicine.
- In 1957, elected Fellow of the Royal Society (London). He was the first Israeli citizen to be elected.
- In 1965, awarded Honorary doctorate from the University of Leeds.
- In 1966, received the Solomon Bublick Award of the Hebrew University of Jerusalem.
- Awarded the Order of the Phoenix, (Greece).
- He also received the Tchernichovsky Prize for exemplary translation, for his translation of The Origin of Species by Charles Darwin.

== Achievements ==
- He helped find the cure for malaria.
- A street in Jerusalem is named after him.
- A room in the Hebrew University of Jerusalem was built in his honour.
- His portrait appeared on a stamp in Israel in 1995.
- He proposed that Charles Darwin's 'mystery illness' was Chagas Disease (American trypanosomiasis). Although this diagnosis has now been disproved, this proposal did much to excite interest in Darwin's chronic ill health.

== Death ==
Saul Adler died in Jerusalem on 25 January 1966. His funeral was attended by the President of Israel.

== Published works ==
- In 1925, he published Sand Flies to Man, a book on the Transmission of Leishmaniasis.
- In 1960, he translated Charles Darwin's The Origin of Species into Hebrew.
