= Billie and Debbie =

Syrian hamsters and U.S. presidential pets to Caroline Kennedy

Billie and Debbie were Syrian hamsters who were United States presidential pets in the care of Caroline Kennedy during the presidency of her father John F. Kennedy. They joined the First Family at the White House in January 1961.

The hamsters came from Everett Engle of Engle Laboratory Animals whose breeding stock originally came from Gulf Hamstery. The hamsters escaped on their second night living at the White House. President Kennedy captured them later under his bed.

The pair had a litter of pups. One hamster drowned in a tub and the rest were eaten by their father and then "the mother hamster killed the father and then died herself, probably of indigestion."
