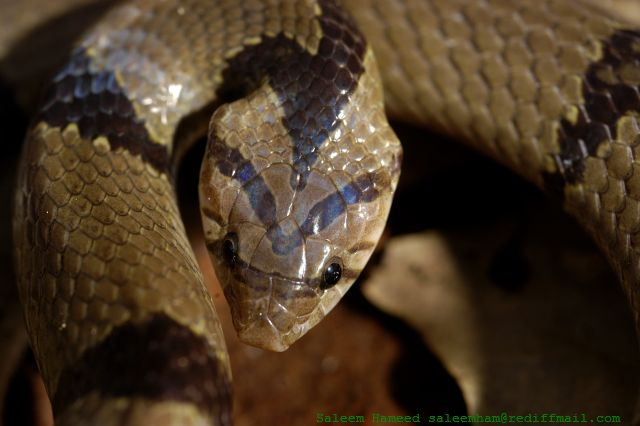

Conservation status
- Least Concern (IUCN 3.1)

Scientific classification
- Kingdom: Animalia
- Phylum: Chordata
- Class: Reptilia
- Order: Squamata
- Suborder: Serpentes
- Family: Colubridae
- Genus: Oligodon
- Species: O. arnensis

Binomial name
- Oligodon arnensis (Shaw, 1802)

Synonyms
- Coluber arnensis Shaw, 1802; Coluber russelius Daudin, 1803; Coronella russelii Schlegel, 1837; Simotes albiventer Günther, 1864; Simotes arnensis Boulenger, 1890; Simotes russelii Duméril, Bibron & Duméril, 1854

= Oligodon arnensis =

Species of snake

The banded kukri snake, russet kukri snake, or common kukri snake, (Oligodon arnensis), is a species of nonvenomous colubrid found mainly in South Asia.

== Description ==
See snake scales for terms used

The nasal scale is divided; the portion of rostral seen from above is as long as its distance from the frontal or a little shorter; the suture between the internasals is usually nearly as long as that between the prefrontals. The frontal is as long as its distance from the end of the snout or a little shorter, and a little shorter than the parietals. The loreal, if distinct, is longer than it is deep, and frequently united with the prefrontal. It has one preocular and two postoculars; the temporals are 1+2; of its seven upper labials, the third and fourth enter the eye; its four lower labials are in contact with the anterior chin shields; the posterior chin shields are one-half to two-thirds the length of the anterior. Its scales are in 17 rows. The ventrals are angulated laterally, and number 170-202; the anal scale is divided; subcaudals are 41–59 in number.

The banded kukuri snake is pale brown or orange above, with well-defined black crossbands, which vary in number and in width according to individuals, and may be edged with white; an angular or transverse black band is found between the eyes, with another behind, with the apex on the frontal, and a third on the nape. Its lower surface is uniform yellowish, rarely spotted with brown, or with a brown posterior border to the ventrals.

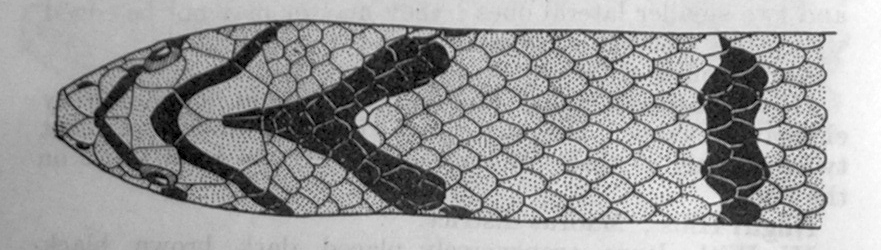
Head (illustration)

Its total length is 24 inches, with a 3.5-inch tail.(female 640 mm, tail 100 mm).

It is found in India and Sri Lanka, northwards to Nepal and the Himalayas, where it has been recorded from an altitude of 4100 feet.

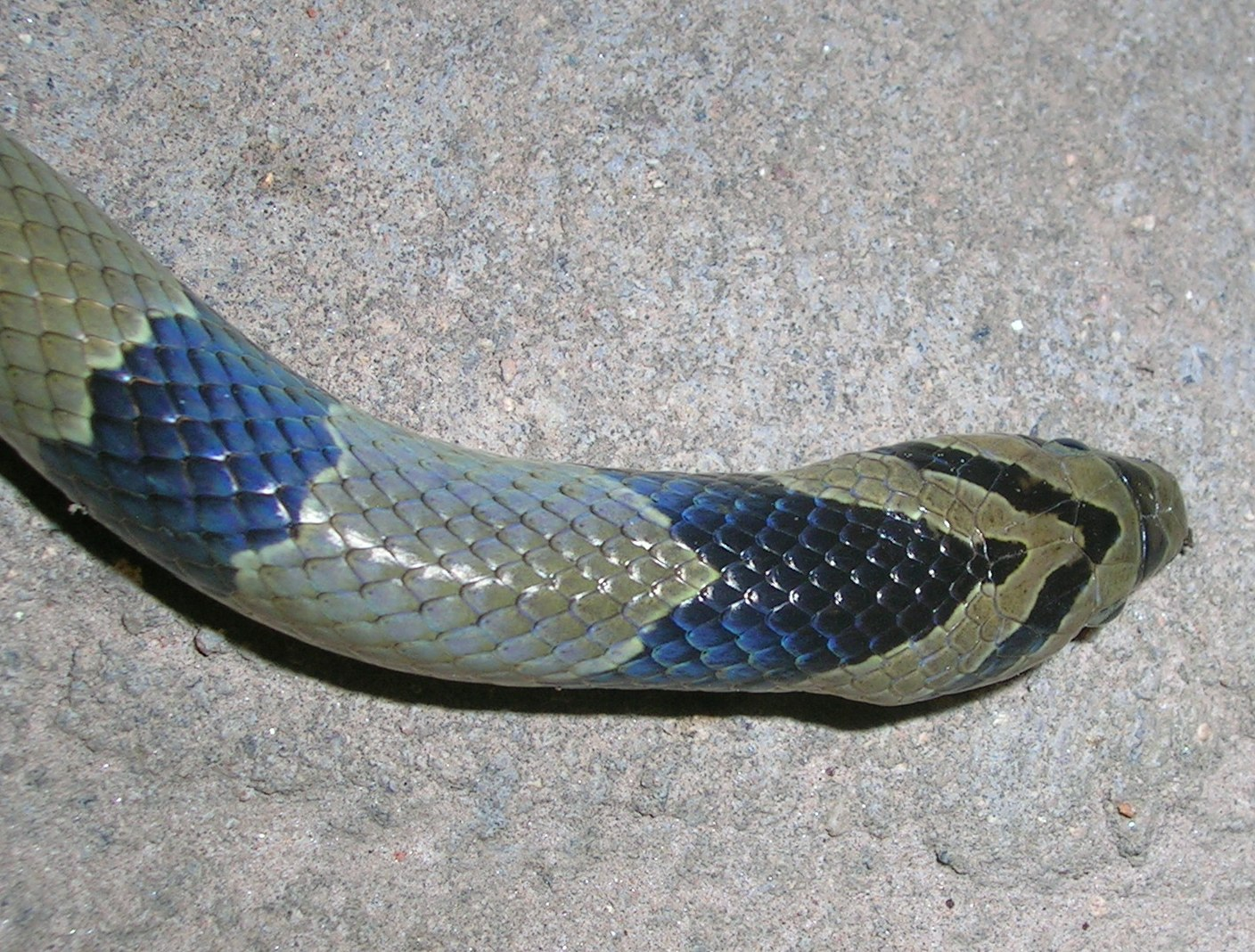
Head

It is nocturnal and feeds on earthworms, insects and larvae.

== Distribution ==
This snake is known to occur in Afghanistan, Bangladesh, India (Tamil Nadu, Delhi, Uttar Pradesh, Orissa, Andhra Pradesh, Madhya Pradesh, Gujarat, Bihar, West Bengal, Uttarakhand, Chhattisgarh, Goa, Kerala, Himachal Pradesh, Rajasthan, Maharashtra and Karnataka), Nepal, Pakistan and Sri Lanka.
