= Israel Aharoni =

Zoologist (1882–1946)

- ישראל אהרוני
- Israel Aharoni (1882–1946)
- Born: 1882; Vidzy, Kovno Governorate, Russian Empire
- Died: 1946 (aged 63–64)
- Education: Charles University
- Known for: Discovery and breeding of Syrian hamsters
- Scientific career
- Fields: Zoology
- Workplaces: Hebrew University of Jerusalem

Israel Aharoni (Hebrew: ישראל אהרוני; 1882–1946) was a zoologist in Ottoman and Israel widely known as the "first Jewish zoologist."

Aharoni is best known for collecting a litter of Syrian hamsters on an expedition to Aleppo, Syria. The hamsters were bred as laboratory animals in Jerusalem, but some escaped through a hole in the floor. The majority of domestic golden hamsters are thus said to be descended from this one litter.

== Biography ==
Israel Aharoni was born in Vidzy, Kovno Governorate, Russian Empire (in present-day Belarus). His father, Avraham Yossef Aharonovich, was the Rosh yeshiva of Vidzy and died before his son Israel was born. Israel lost his mother as well when he was two years old. Being an orphan, he lived with his grandmother and studied at a Cheder and later on at the Telshe yeshiva. At the age of 13, Israel ran away from his home to Prague, where he attended school and later on continued to learn zoology at Charles University.

He immigrated to Palestine in 1901. His early zoological expeditions took place under the protection of the local Sultan, for whom he obtained butterfly specimens. Many of his collected specimens can still be viewed at the Hebrew University of Jerusalem.

== Zoology career ==
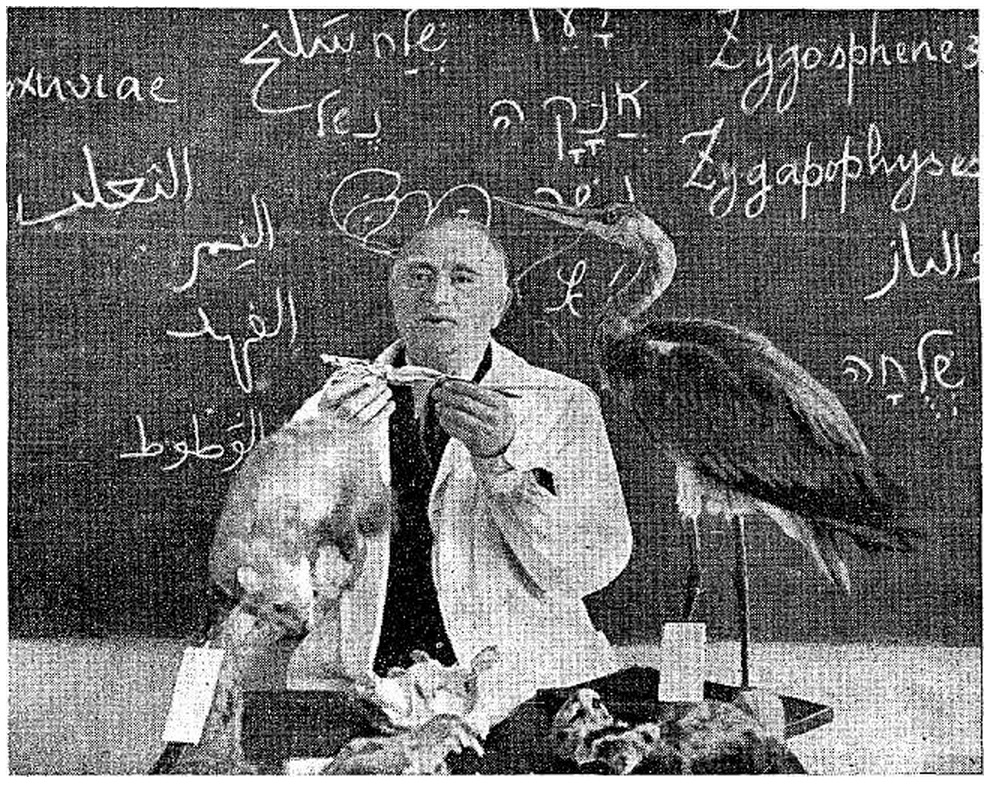
Aharoni lecturing at Hebrew University of Jerusalem

Aharoni discovered 30 previously unknown species of animals, insects and birds, and is credited with giving them Hebrew names. In 1930, Aharoni set off to look for Syrian hamsters at the request of his colleague Saul Adler, a parasitologist who was looking for an easily breedable alternative to the Chinese hamster for research on the disease Leishmaniasis. Syrian hamsters had been discovered and named by George Robert Waterhouse in 1839 but had not been sighted since. Together with a Syrian guide named Georgius Khalil Tah'an, Aharoni managed to discover a nest containing a female and eleven young in the Aleppo region. However, cannibalism of one of the litter by the mother, and the subsequent death of the mother, meant that Aharoni had to hand-rear the pups during the journey back. The four that made it were bred successfully and used extensively in laboratories, before being introduced to the pet market in the 1940s.
