= The Natural History of Aleppo =

1756 book by Alexander Russell

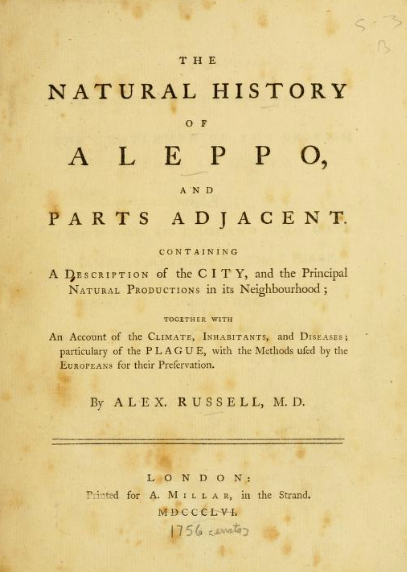
- Title page for The Natural History of Aleppo and parts adjacent containing a description of the city, and the principal natural productions in its neighborhood; together with an account of the climate, inhabitants, and diseases particularly of the plague, with the methods used by the Europeans for their preservation (1756)
- Author: Alexander Russell, Patrick Russell
- Original title: The natural history of Aleppo, and parts adjacent. Containing a description of the city, and the principal natural productions in its neighbourhood; together with an account of the climate, inhabitants, and diseases; particularly of the plague, with the methods used by the Europeans for their preservation
- Subject: Natural history
- Publication date: 1756
- Publication place: Scotland

The Natural History of Aleppo is a 1756 book by naturalist Alexander Russell on the natural history of Aleppo. In 1794 his half-brother, Patrick Russell, revised and expanded the text in a second edition. The book is significant for its quality, the contemporary interest it attracted, and for being a product of the Scottish Enlightenment.

When the book was published it was immediately an important European record and perspective on the state of contemporary science in Syria.

The book contains the earliest known description of the Syrian hamster.
