= Gulf Hamstery =

American hamstery

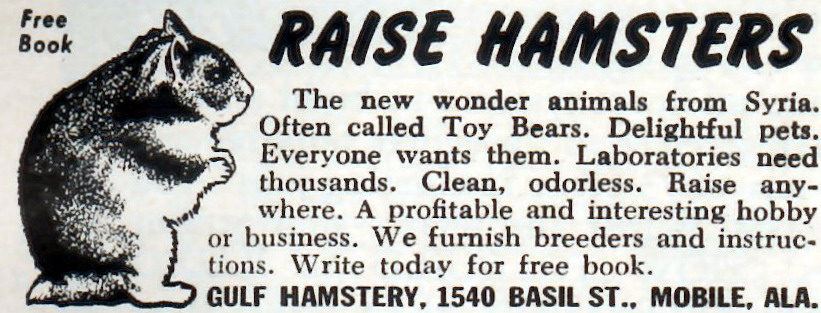
This advertisement from Gulf Hamstery appeared in numerous popular science magazines around 1948–1951.

Gulf Hamstery was a hamstery which established the commercial Syrian hamster industry in the United States. It operated between 1946 through the early 1950s and was located in Mobile, Alabama.

== History ==
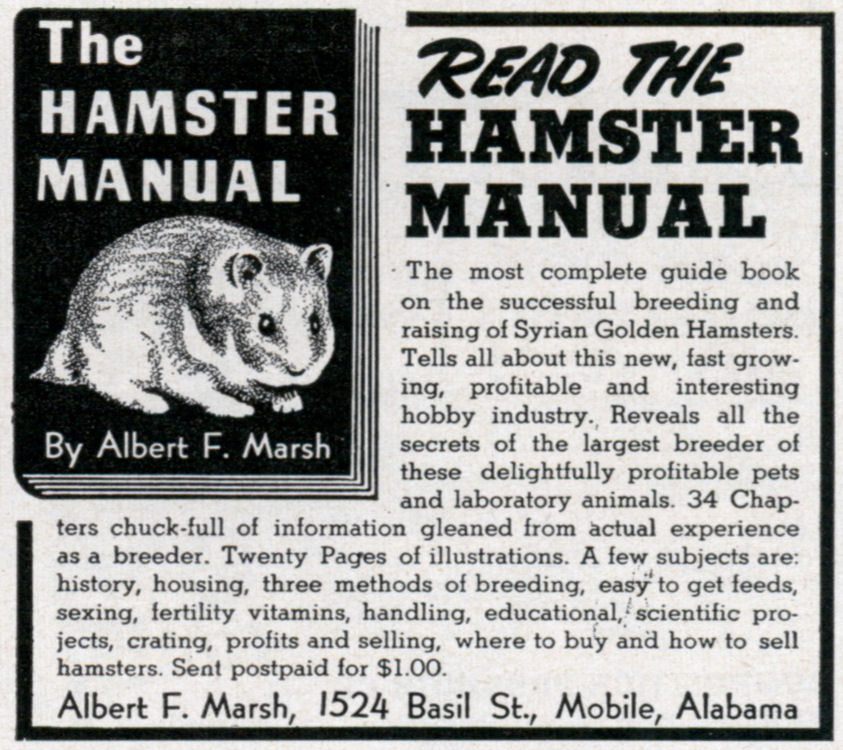
Marsh's book instructed hamster owners on hamster care and establishing a business hamstery

In 1946 Albert Marsh of Mobile, Alabama, won a hamster as payment for a $1 gambling debt. This hamster came probably from the breeding stock managed by Guy Henry Faget in Carville, Louisiana. At the time, Marsh was a highway engineer but unemployed. After getting his hamsters, he learned to breed them and founded Marsh Enterprises and the Gulf Hamstery, which promoted Syrian hamsters as pets, for laboratory use, and in business schemes. Marsh took advertisements in magazines, comics, and livestock trade journals which praised hamsters as pets and presented the idea that breeding hamsters was a good business investment. In his business, he shipped hamsters to people who would be breeders, then he coordinated the shipment of various breeders' hamsters to other breeders or to laboratories.

Marsh was successful in part because of the professionalism he brought to the art of hamster husbandry. In 1946, Marsh began a campaign to legalize the ownership of hamsters in California, where it was prohibited. On 10 February 1948, with the help of the governor of Alabama and others, Marsh was successful in convincing the California State Department of Agriculture to designate Syrian hamsters as "normally domesticated animals". Also by 1948 Gulf Hamstery employed 18 people including 5 office staff. 1948 was the first publication of Marsh's book The Hamster Manual, which had a distribution of 80,000 copies by its 6th edition in 1951. In 1951 Gulf Hamstery generated US$200,000 in revenue.

The hamstery business peaked from 1948–1951 then profitability dropped to almost nothing in the early 1950s. The market changed when small hamsteries, most of which started with hamsters from Marsh, became available everywhere and satisfied local demand for pet hamsters. Marsh's Gulf Hamstery closed in the 1950s. Marsh later moved to California and operated a quail breedery.

== Related organizations ==
Various hamsteries were founded with hamsters from the Gulf Hamstery stock and by using The Hamster Manual as advice. The two largest hamsteries founded in this way were Engle Laboratory Animals and the Lakeview Hamster Colony.

In 1949, 14-year old Everett Engle founded Engle Laboratory Animals based on a Gulf Hamstery order for a male and two female hamsters along with the book. Within two years Engle had a stable business selling hamsters to laboratories. By his mid-twenties hamster husbandry was his full-time job, and his regular clients included Pfizer, Mead Johnson, Dow Chemical Company, and Eli Lilly and Company. In 1961, John F. Kennedy thanked the Engle family for providing hamsters ("Billy" & "Debbie") to Caroline Kennedy. By the 1970s Engle Laborary Animals was delivering 14,000 hamsters per week to laboratories. In 1984 Harlan acquired Engle Laboratories. As of 2009 Engle's three sons have continued their careers as animal breeders for Harlan.

Steven Slater founded the Lakeview Hamster Colony. At the time he was an employee of Owens-Illinois and living in New Jersey, and he founded the hamstery after refusing his employer's request that he move with his family to work in another location. Slater's breeding stock of hamsters originated in the Gulf Hamstery. Slater developed a hamster with a defined microbiota by raising it in a sterile environment, and he also introduced other innovations in laboratory hamster breeding. In 1969 he sold Lakeview to Charles River Laboratories.
