= Patrick Russell (herpetologist) =

Scottish surgeon and naturalist

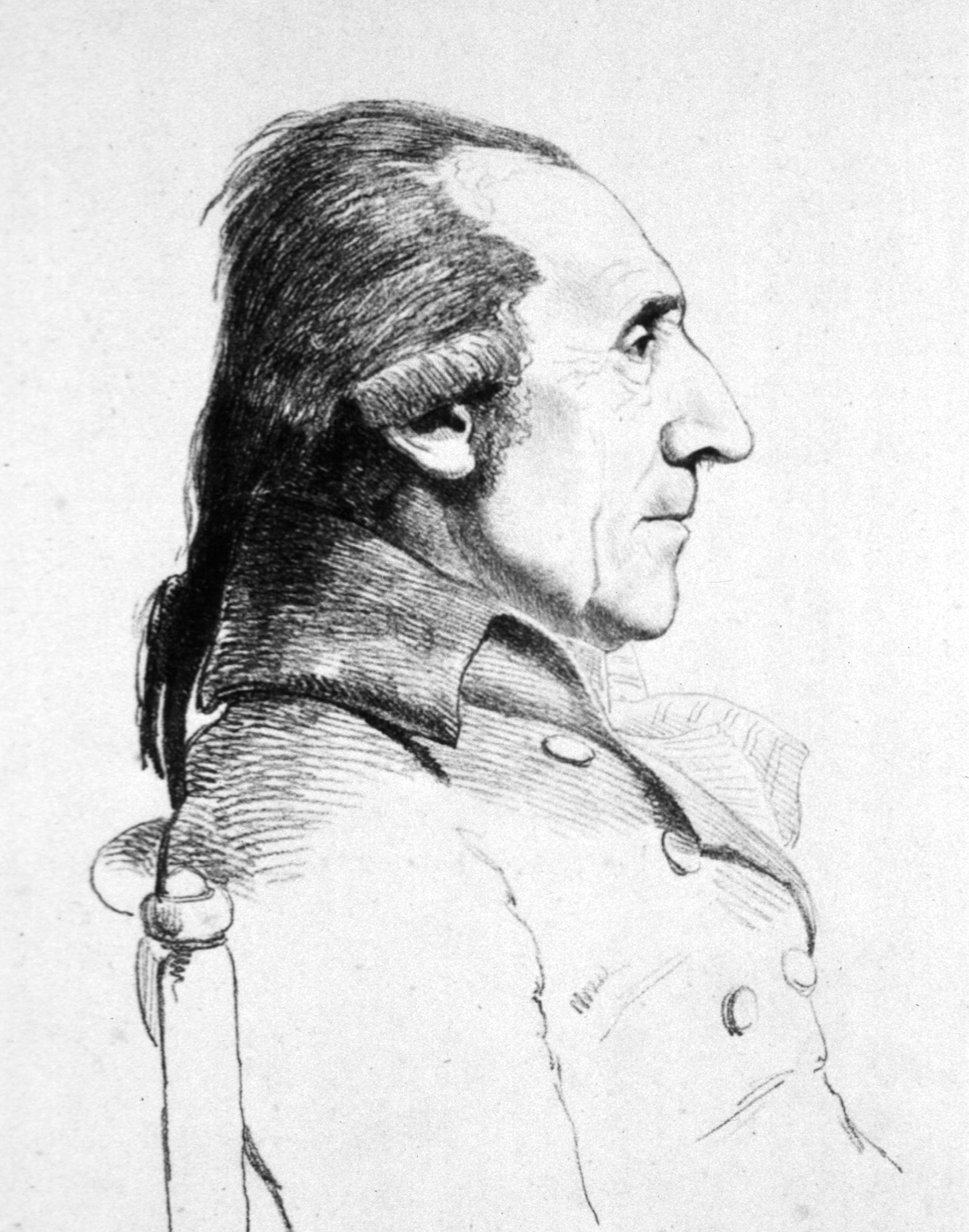
Patrick Russell in 1794, by William Daniell

Patrick Russell (6 February 1726, Edinburgh – 2 July 1805, London) was a Scottish surgeon and naturalist who worked in India. He studied the snakes of India and is considered the "Father of Indian Ophiology". Russell's viper (Daboia russelii) is named after him, as is Russell's kukri snake (Oligodon russelius).

== Early life ==
The fifth son of John Russell, a well-known lawyer of Edinburgh, and his third wife Mary, Patrick was the half-brother of Alexander Russell, FRS and William Russell, FRS. Patrick studied Roman and Greek classics at Edinburgh high school after which he studied medicine at the University under Alexander Monro. He graduated as a Doctor of Medicine in 1750 and joined his half-brother, Alexander Russell, who was 12 years senior in Aleppo, Syria. In 1740 Alexader had been made a Physician to the Levant Company's Factory. Alexander was involved in quarantine and disease control and was a keen naturalist with a knowledge of local languages and a close friend of the Pasha. In 1746 he became a ship's surgeon aboard the ''Delawar'' plying between London and Turkey via Livorno. In 1753, “Patricius Russel” received an MD in absentia from King’s College, Aberdeen.

== Aleppo ==
In 1753, Alexander resigned, returning to London and publishing a Natural History of Aleppo and Parts Adjacent in 1756. Patrick took up the position left by Alexander and worked for about 18 years. The Pasha of Aleppo held him in high regard, even honouring him with a turban. A keen observer of traditions, he noted in a letter read by Alexander to the Royal Society an Arabian practice of inoculating children against smallpox using "variolus matter". Several outbreaks of bubonic plague occurred in Aleppo in 1760, 1761, and 1762. He studied the conditions of those who were infected and identified procedures to avoid infection such as breathing through a handkerchief soaked in vinegar. He continued to maintain notes on natural history, and after Alexander died in 1768, he revised the Natural History of Aleppo in 1794. He noticed that fleas tended to reduce in numbers after the hottest weather, a climate he noticed also led to a decline in the number of plague cases.

== Return to England ==
In 1771 he left Aleppo and travelled through Italy, examining the methods used to reduce the spread of diseases. Initially intending to set up practice in Edinburgh, he was persuaded by Dr. John Fothergill, to move instead to London. Dr. Fothergill was a friend of Alexander, an eminent physician and the founder of a botanical garden. While in London, Patrick was introduced to Sir Joseph Banks and Daniel Solander who examined his collections from Aleppo. In 1777, Patrick was elected a Fellow of the Royal Society.

== India ==
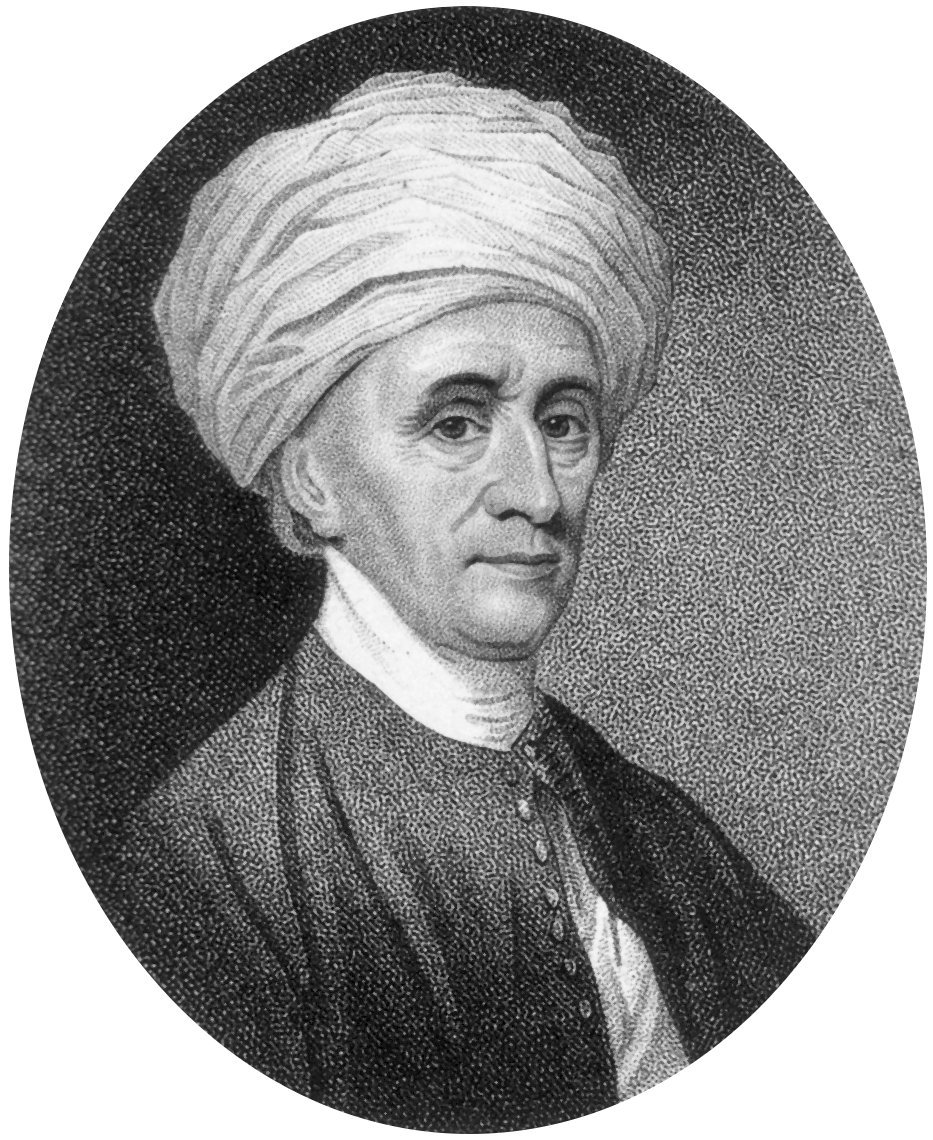
Patrick Russell with Turban in Aleppo, c. 1770.

In 1781, a younger brother, Claud became a chief administrator of the East India Company at Vizagapatam in the Madras Presidency. Claud, however, suffered poor health, and the family insisted that Patrick attend to him. Arriving in India, he began to study the natural history of the region. The naturalist to the East India Company in the Carnatic was Dr. John Koenig, student of Carolus Linnaeus, and when he died in 1785, the Governor of Madras personally offered the post of 'Botanist and Naturalist' to Patrick. This post, according to Ray Desmond (1992, European Discovery of Indian Flora) was:

The Company's expectations of their Naturalist were excessively optimistic. He was presumed to be a linguist, demographer, antiquarian, meteorologist, mineralogist and zoologist (in addition to being a botanist).

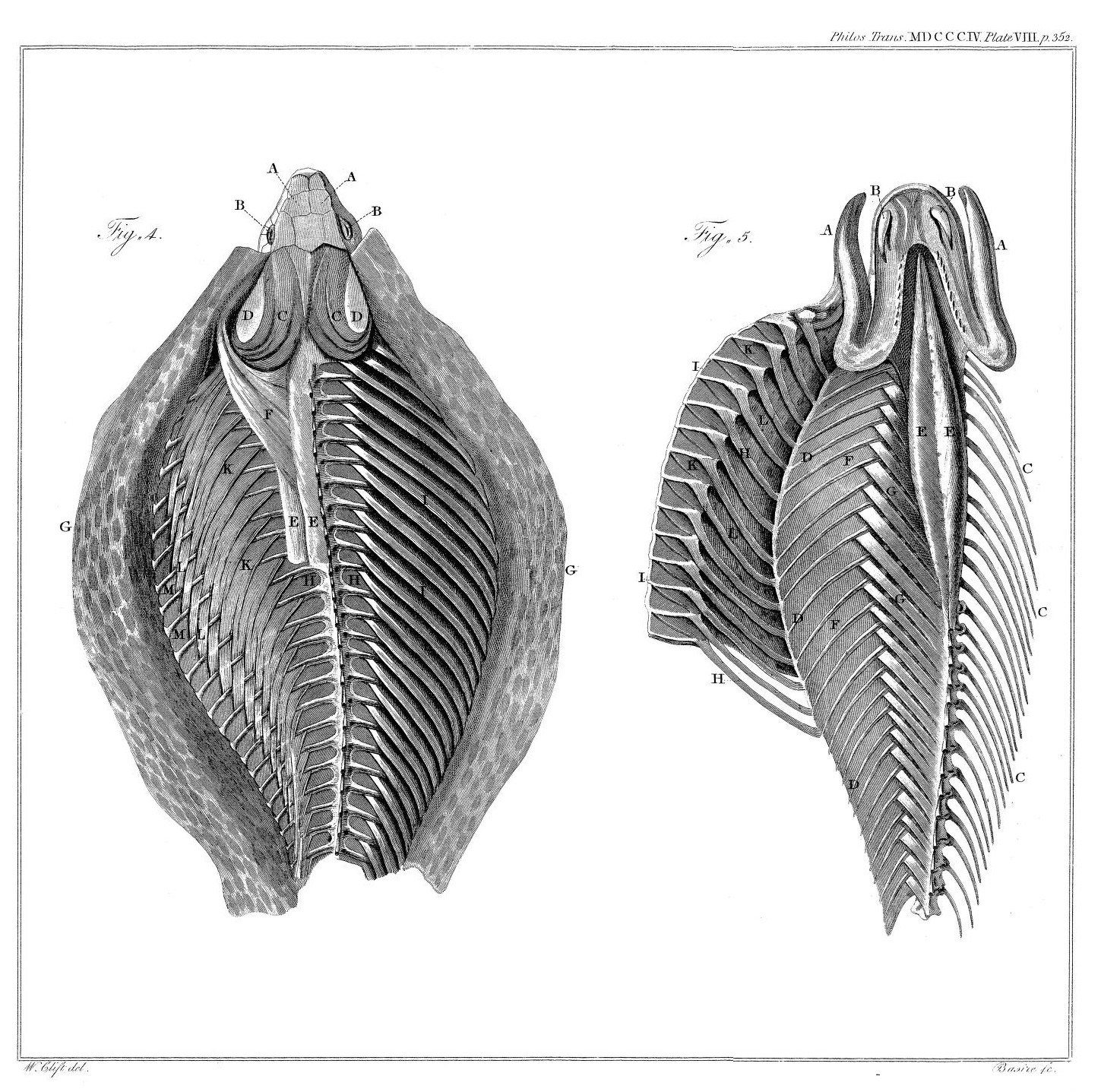
Structure of the cobra hood. William Clift, 1804

Russell wrote about the plant and animal life of Madras as he had of Aleppo. As a physician, as well as a naturalist, to the East India Company in the Carnatic, he was concerned with the problem of snakebite and made it his aim to find a way for people to identify venomous snakes. He also made a large collection of plants. One of the snakes he identified was Katuka Rekula Poda, which he noted was not well known to Europeans, but was second only to the cobra in its lethality. Russell attempted to classify the snakes using the nature of scales, but his quest was to find an easy way to separate the venomous snakes from the non-venomous. He conducted envenomation experiments on dogs and chickens and described the symptoms. He tested remedies claimed for snakebite including a pill from Tanjore which was very popular and found that it did not work. In one case a soldier in torpor was brought to him and the common treatment used by Europeans was tested. Two bottles of warm Madeira wine were forcibly poured into the patient's mouth, who then completely recovered. Patrick, his brother Claud and the family left for England in January 1791. Some of the collections he made were placed in the museum at Madras, although he took back some snake skins that are now in the collection of the Natural History Museum at London. Some dry snake skins mounted on paper in the manner of herbarium specimens were formerly thought to have been made by Russell, but these preparation were probably made after 1837, although one of them has been considered to be the type for Hydrus piscator described by Schneider in 1799. Returning to England, he worked on the book on snakes, which was to be published by the East India Company. The first volume of his An Account of Indian Serpents Collected on the Coast of Coromandel was published in 1796 with 44 plates. The second volume appeared in four parts, the first two of which were published in 1801 and 1802. These included 46 coloured plates. Patrick Russell died on 2 July 1805, three days after an illness. He never married. The third and fourth parts of the second volume of his book were published after his death in 1807 and 1809. Two scientific papers were read on the pits of the pit viper Trimeresurus, which he demonstrated as not being associated with hearing. Another paper demonstrated the voluntary mechanism by which the cobra spread its hood.

Preceded by Johann Gerhard König	Naturalist to the H.E.I.C. at Madras; 1785-1789	Succeeded by William Roxburgh
