= Alexander Russell (naturalist) =

Scottish physician and naturalist

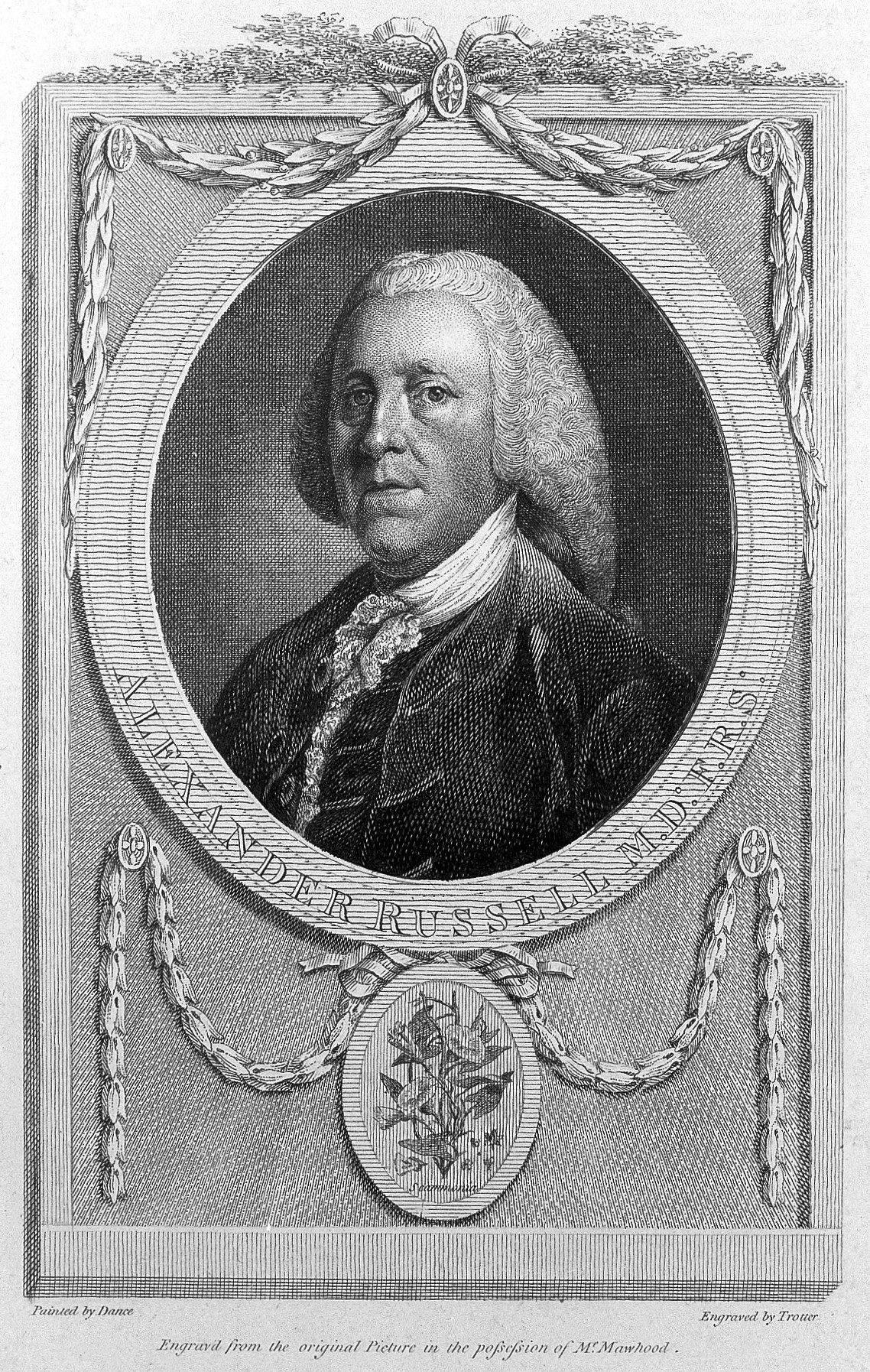

Alexander Russell (c. 1715 – 25 November 1768) was a Scottish physician and naturalist, spending 14 years at the English factory in Aleppo.

== Early life ==
Russell was born in Edinburgh in 1715, the son of lawyer John Russell. He was the half-brother of Patrick Russell He was educated at the University of Edinburgh, and after graduating with an MD, went to London in about 1734.

== Aleppo ==
Russell sailed to Aleppo in 1740, having been appointed physician to the English factory there. He became the city's chief medical practitioner, through gaining the confidence of the local pasha. In 1754 he returned to England and two years later published his The Natural History of Aleppo, with a diary of the progress of the plague in 1742–1744. He was elected a Fellow of the Royal Society in 1756.

== St Thomas's Hospital, London ==
In 1759 he was elected to fill a vacancy at St Thomas' Hospital in London. He remained in that role until his death on 25 November 1768.

== Publications ==
Russell's written works include:

- Testamen Medicum et Medicastrorum audacitate. Edin. 1709, 8vo.
- The Natural History of Aleppo. Lond. 1756, 4to. 2d edition revised, enlarged, and illustrated with Notes, by his brother, Patrick Russell, M.D. Lond. 1794, 2 vols. 4to. This valuable history has been translated into different European languages.
- Of a remarkable Marine Production. Phil. Trans. 1762, Abr. xi. 635. Vorticella Ovifera Lin.
- Letter describing the Scammony Plant. Med. Obs. And Inq. i. p. 12, 1755.
- Account of two Paralytic Cases. Ib. p. 296.
- Cases of Lues Venerea cured by a solution of Corrosive Sublimate. Ib. ii. p. 88.
- Of several Hydatids discharged with the Urine. Ib. iii. p. 146. 1767.
- Experiments made with the Decoction of Mezereon in Venereal Nodes. Ib. p. 189.
- Case of almost universal Emphysema. Ib. p. 397.
- An Essay on his Character. Lond. 1770, 4to.
